Institutional racism, also known as systemic racism, is defined as policies and practices that exist throughout a whole society or organization, and that result in and support a continued unfair advantage to some people and unfair or harmful treatment of others based on race. It manifests as discrimination in areas such as criminal justice, employment, housing, health care, education, and political representation.

The term institutional racism was first coined in 1967 by Stokely Carmichael and Charles V. Hamilton in Black Power: The Politics of Liberation. Carmichael and Hamilton wrote in 1967 that while individual racism is often identifiable because of its overt nature, institutional racism is less perceptible because of its "less overt, far more subtle" nature. Institutional racism "originates in the operation of established and respected forces in the society, and thus receives far less public condemnation than [individual racism]".

Institutional racism was defined by Sir William Macpherson in the UK's Lawrence report (1999) as: "The collective failure of an organisation to provide an appropriate and professional service to people because of their colour, culture, or ethnic origin". It can be seen or detected in processes, attitudes and behaviour that amount to discrimination through prejudice, ignorance, thoughtlessness, and racist stereotyping which disadvantage minority ethnic people."

Classification

In the past, the term "racism" was often used interchangeably with "prejudice," forming an opinion of another person based on incomplete information. In the last quarter of the 20th Century, racism became associated with systems rather than individuals. In 1977, David Wellman in his book Portraits of White Racism, defined racism as "a system of advantage based on race," illustrating this definition through countless examples of white people supporting racist institutions while denying that they are prejudiced. White people can be nice to people of color while continuing to uphold systemic racism that benefits them, such as lending practices, well-funded schools, and job opportunities. The concept of institutional racism re-emerged in political discourse in the mid and late 1990s, but has remained a contested concept. Institutional racism is where race causes a different level of access to the goods, services, and opportunities of society.

Professor James M. Jones theorised three major types of racism: personally mediated, internalized, and institutionalized. Personally mediated racism includes the deliberate specific social attitudes to racially prejudiced action (bigoted differential assumptions about abilities, motives, and the intentions of others according to their race), discrimination (the differential actions and behaviours towards others according to their race), stereotyping, commission, and omission (disrespect, suspicion, devaluation, and dehumanization). Internalized racism is the acceptance, by members of the racially stigmatized people, of negative perceptions about their own abilities and intrinsic worth, characterized by low self-esteem, and low esteem of others like them. This racism can be manifested through embracing "whiteness" (e.g. stratification by skin colour in non-white communities), self-devaluation (e.g., racial slurs, nicknames, rejection of ancestral culture, etc.), and resignation, helplessness, and hopelessness (e.g., dropping out of school, failing to vote, engaging in health-risk practices, etc.).

Persistent negative stereotypes fuel institutional racism, and influence interpersonal relations. Racial stereotyping contributes to patterns of racial residential segregation and redlining, and shapes views about crime, crime policy, and welfare policy, especially if the contextual information is stereotype-consistent.

Institutional racism is distinguished from racial bigotry by the existence of systemic, institutionalized policies, practices and economic and political structures that place minority racial and ethnic groups at a disadvantage in relation to an institution's racial or ethnic majority. One example of the difference is public school budgets in the U.S. (including local levies and bonds) and the quality of teachers, which are often correlated with property values: rich neighborhoods are more likely to be more "white" and to have better teachers and more money for education, even in public schools. Restrictive housing contracts and bank lending policies have also been listed as forms of institutional racism.

Other examples sometimes described as institutional racism are racial profiling by security guards and police, use of stereotyped racial caricatures, the under- and misrepresentation of certain racial groups in the mass media, and race-based barriers to gainful employment and professional advancement. Additionally, differential access to goods, services, and opportunities of society can be included within the term "institutional racism", such as unpaved streets and roads, inherited socio-economic disadvantage, and standardized tests (each ethnic group prepared for it differently; many are poorly prepared).

Some sociological investigators distinguish between institutional racism and "structural racism" (sometimes referred to as "structured racialization"). The former focuses upon the norms and practices within an institution, the latter upon the interactions among institutions, interactions that produce racialized outcomes against non-white people. An important feature of structural racism is that it cannot be reduced to individual prejudice or to the single function of an institution.

Algeria

The French political thinker Alexis de Tocqueville (1805–1859) supported colonization in general, particularly the colonization of Algeria. In several speeches on France's foreign affairs and in two official reports presented to the National Assembly in March 1847 on behalf of an ad hoc commission, he also repeatedly commented on and analyzed the issue in his voluminous correspondence. In short, Tocqueville developed a theoretical basis for French expansion in North Africa. He even studied the Koran, sharply concluding that Islam was "the main cause of the decadence... of the Muslim world". His opinions are also instructive about the early years of the French conquest and how the colonial state was first set up and organized. Tocqueville emerged as an early advocate of "total domination" in Algeria and subsequent "devastation of the country".

On 31 January 1830, Charles X capturing Algiers made the French state thus begin what became institutional racism directed at the Kabyle, or Berbers, of Arab descent in north Africa. The Dey of Algiers had insulted the monarchy by slapping the French ambassador with a fly whisk, and the French used that pretext to invade and to put an end to piracy in the vicinity. The unofficial objective was to restore the prestige of the French crown and gain a foothold in North Africa, thereby preventing the British gaining advantage over France in the Mediterranean. The July Monarchy, which came to power in 1830, inherited that burden. The next ten years saw the indigenous population subjected to the might of the French army. By 1840, more conservative elements gained control of the government and dispatched General Thomas Bugeaud, the newly appointed governor of the colony, to Algeria, which marked the real start of the country's conquest. The methods employed were atrocious; the army deported villagers en masse, massacred the men and raped the women, took the children hostage, stole livestock and harvests and destroyed orchards. Tocqueville wrote, "I believe the laws of war entitle us to ravage the country and that we must do this, either by destroying crops at harvest time, or all the time by making rapid incursions, known as raids, the aim of which is to carry off men and flocks."

Tocqueville added: "In France I have often heard people I respect, but do not approve, deplore [the army] burning harvests, emptying granaries and seizing unarmed men, women and children. As I see it, these are unfortunate necessities that any people wishing to make war on the Arabs must accept." He also advocated that "all political freedoms must be suspended in Algeria". Marshal Bugeaud, who was the first governor-general and also headed the civil government, was rewarded by the King for the conquest and having instituted the systemic use of torture, and following a "scorched earth" policy against the Arab population.

Land grab
Once the conquest of Algiers was accomplished soldier-politician Bertrand Clauzel and others formed a company to acquire agricultural land and, despite official discouragement, to subsidise its settlement by European farmers, which triggered a land rush. He became governor general in 1835 and used his office to make private investments in land by encouraging bureaucrats and army officers in his administration to do the same. The development created a vested interest in government officials for greater French involvement in Algeria. Merchants with influence in the government also saw profit in land speculation, which resulted in expanding the French occupation. Large agricultural tracts were carved out, and factories and businesses began exploiting cheap local labour and also benefited from laws and edicts that gave control to the French. The policy of limited occupation was formally abandoned in 1840 and replaced by one of complete control. By 1843, Tocqueville intended to protect and extend expropriation by the rule of law and so advocated setting up special courts, which were based on what he called "summary" procedure, to carry out a massive expropriation for the benefit of French and other European settlers, who could thus purchase land at attractive prices and live in villages, which the colonial government had equipped with fortifications, churches, schools and even fountains. His belief, which framed his writings and influenced state actions, was that the local people, who had been driven out by the army and robbed of their land by the judges, would gradually die out.

The French colonial state, as he conceived it and as it took shape in Algeria, was a two-tiered organization, quite unlike the regime in Mainland France. It introduced two different political and legal systems that were based on racial, cultural and religious distinctions. According to Tocqueville, the system that should apply to the Colons would enable them alone to hold property and travel freely but would deprive them of any form of political freedom, which should be suspended in Algeria. "There should therefore be two quite distinct legislations in Africa, for there are two very separate communities. There is absolutely nothing to prevent us treating Europeans as if they were on their own, as the rules established for them will only ever apply to them".

Following the defeats of the resistance in the 1840s, colonisation continued apace. By 1848, Algeria was populated by 109,400 Europeans, only 42,274 of whom were French. The leader of the Colons delegation, Auguste Warnier (1810–1875), succeeded in the 1870s in modifying or introducing legislation to facilitate the private transfer of land to settlers and continue Algeria's appropriation of land from the local population and distribution to settlers. Europeans held about 30% of the total arable land, including the bulk of the most fertile land and most of the areas under irrigation. In 1881, the Code de l'Indigénat made the discrimination official by creating specific penalties for indigenes and by organising the seizure or appropriation of their lands. By 1900, Europeans produced more than two-thirds of the value of output in agriculture and practically all of the agricultural exports. The colonial government imposed more and higher taxes on Muslims than on Europeans. The Muslims, in addition to paying traditional taxes dating from before the French conquest, also paid new taxes from which the Colons were normally exempted. In 1909, for instance, Muslims, who made up almost 90% of the population but produced 20% of Algeria's income, paid 70% of direct taxes and 45% of the total taxes collected. Also, Colons controlled how the revenues would be spent and so their towns had handsome municipal buildings, paved streets lined with trees, fountains and statues, but Algerian villages and rural areas benefited little, if at all, from tax revenues.

In education
The colonial regime proved severely detrimental to overall education for Muslims, who had previously relied on religious schools to learn reading, writing, and religion. The state appropriated the habus lands, the religious foundations that constituted the main source of income for religious institutions, including schools, in 1843, but colonial officials refused to allocate enough money to maintain schools and mosques properly and to provide for enough teachers and religious leaders for the growing population. In 1892, more than five times as much was spent for the education of Europeans as for Muslims, who had five times as many children of school age. Because few Muslim teachers were trained, Muslim schools were largely staffed by French teachers. Even a state-operated madrasa often had French faculty members. Attempts to institute bilingual, bicultural schools, intended to bring Muslim and European children together in the classroom, were a conspicuous failure, which were rejected by both communities and phased out after 1870. According to one estimate, fewer than 5% of Algerian children attended any kind of school in 1870. As late as 1954, only one Muslim boy in five and one girl in sixteen received formal schooling. Efforts were begun by 1890 to educate a small number of Muslims along with European students in the French school system as part of France's "civilising mission" in Algeria. The curriculum was entirely French and allowed no place for Arabic studies, which were deliberately downgraded even in Muslim schools. Within a generation, a class of well-educated, gallicized Muslims, the évolués (literally "evolved ones"), had been created.

Enfranchisement
Following its conquest of Ottoman Algeria in 1830, France maintained for well over a century its colonial rule in the territory that has been described as "quasi-apartheid". The colonial law of 1865 allowed Arab and Berber Algerians to apply for French citizenship only if they abandoned their Muslim identity; Azzedine Haddour argues that it established "the formal structures of a political apartheid". Camille Bonora-Waisman writes, "In contrast with the Moroccan and Tunisian protectorates", the "colonial apartheid society" was unique to Algeria.

Under the French Fourth Republic, Muslim Algerians were accorded the rights of citizenship, but the system of discrimination was maintained in more informal ways. Frederick Cooper writes that Muslim Algerians "were still marginalized in their own territory, notably the separate voter roles of 'French' civil status and of 'Muslim' civil status, to keep their hands on power." The "internal system of apartheid" was met with considerable resistance by the Algerian Muslims affected by it, and it is cited as one of the causes of the 1954 insurrection.

There was clearly nothing exceptional about the crimes committed by the French army and state in Algeria in 1955 to 1962. On the contrary, they were part of history repeating itself.

State racism

Following the views of Michel Foucault, the French historian Olivier Le Cour Grandmaison spoke of a "state racism" under the French Third Republic, a notable example being the 1881 Indigenous Code applied in Algeria. Replying to the question "Isn't it excessive to talk about a state racism under the Third Republic?", he replied:
 "No, if we can recognize 'state racism' as the vote and implementation of discriminatory measures, grounded on a combination of racial, religious and cultural criteria, in those territories. The 1881 Indigenous Code is a monument of this genre! Considered by contemporary prestigious jurists as a 'juridical monstruosity', this code planned special offenses and penalties for 'Arabs'. It was then extended to other territories of the empire. On one hand, a state of rule of law for a minority of French and Europeans located in the colonies. On the other hand, a permanent state of exception for the "indigenous" people. This situation lasted until 1945".

During a reform effort in 1947, the French created a bicameral legislature with one house for French citizens and another for Muslims, but it made a European's vote worth seven times a Muslim's vote. Even the events of 1961 show that France had not changed its treatment of the Algerians over the years, as the police took up the institutional racism that the French state had made law in its treatment of Arabs who, as Frenchmen, had moved to Mainland France.

Further reading
 Original text: Library of Congress Country Study of Algeria
 Aussaresses, Paul. The Battle of the Casbah: Terrorism and Counter-Terrorism in Algeria, 1955–1957. (New York: Enigma Books, 2010) .
 Bennoune, Mahfoud. The Making of Contemporary Algeria, 1830–1987 (Cambridge University Press, 2002)
 Gallois, William. A History of Violence in the Early Algerian Colony (2013), On French violence 1830–1847 online review
 Horne, Alistair. A Savage War of Peace: Algeria 1954–1962, (Viking Adult, 1978)
Mohammed Lakhdar-Hamina
The Battle of Algiers
 The 1961 massacre was referenced in Caché, a 2005 film by Michael Haneke.
 The 2005 French television drama-documentary Nuit noire, 17 octobre 1961 explores in detail the events of the massacre. It follows the lives of several people and also shows some of the divisions within the Paris police, with some openly arguing for more violence while others tried to uphold the rule of law.
 Drowning by Bullets, a television documentary in the British Secret History series, first shown on 13 July 1992.

Australia

It is estimated that the population of Aboriginal peoples prior to the European colonisation of Australia (starting in 1788) was about 314,000. It has also been estimated by ecologists that the land could have supported a population of a million people. By 1901 they had been reduced by two-thirds to 93,000. In 2011 First Nations Australians (comprising both Aboriginal Australians and Torres Strait Islander people) comprised about 3% of the total population, at 661,000. When Captain Cook landed in Botany Bay in 1770, he was under orders not to plant the British flag and to defer to any native population, which was largely ignored.

Land rights, stolen generations, and terra nullius

Torres Strait Islander people are indigenous to the Torres Strait Islands, which are in the Torres Strait between the northernmost tip of Queensland and Papua New Guinea. Institutional racism had its early roots here due to interactions between these islanders, who had Melanesian origins and depended on the sea for sustenance and whose land rights were abrogated, and later the Australian Aboriginal peoples, whose children were removed from their families by Australian Federal and State government agencies and church missions, under acts of their respective parliaments. The removals occurred in the period between approximately 1909 and 1969, resulting in what later became known as the Stolen Generations. An example of the abandonment of mixed-race ("half-caste") children in the 1920s is given in a report by Walter Baldwin Spencer that many mixed-descent children born during construction of The Ghan railway were abandoned at early ages with no one to provide for them. This incident and others spurred the need for state action to provide for and protect such children. Both were official policy and were coded into law by various acts. They have both been rescinded and restitution for past wrongs addressed at the highest levels of government.

The treatment of the First people by the colonisers has been termed cultural genocide. The earliest introduction of child removal to legislation is recorded in the Victorian Aboriginal Protection Act 1869. The Central Board for the Protection of Aborigines had been advocating such powers since 1860, and the passage of the Act gave the colony of Victoria a wide suite of powers over Aboriginal and "half-caste" persons, including the forcible removal of children, especially "at risk" girls. By 1950, similar policies and legislation had been adopted by other states and territories, such as the Aboriginals Protection and Restriction of the Sale of Opium Act 1897 (Qld), the Aborigines Ordinance 1918 (NT), the Aborigines Act 1934 (SA) and the 1936 Native Administration Act (WA).

The child removal legislation resulted in widespread removal of children from their parents and exercise of sundry guardianship powers by Protectors of Aborigines up to the age of 16 or 21. Policemen or other agents of the state were given the power to locate and transfer babies and children of mixed descent from their mothers or families or communities into institutions. In these Australian states and territories, half-caste institutions (both government Aboriginal reserves and church-run mission stations) were established in the early decades of the 20th century for the reception of these separated children. Examples of such institutions include Moore River Native Settlement in Western Australia, Doomadgee Aboriginal Mission in Queensland, Ebenezer Mission in Victoria and Wellington Valley Mission in New South Wales.

In 1911, the Chief Protector of Aborigines in South Australia, William Garnet South, reportedly "lobbied for the power to remove Aboriginal children without a court hearing because the courts sometimes refused to accept that the children were neglected or destitute". South argued that "all children of mixed descent should be treated as neglected". His lobbying reportedly played a part in the enactment of the Aborigines Act 1911; this made him the legal guardian of every Aboriginal child in South Australia, including so-called "half-castes". Bringing Them Home, a report on the status of the mixed race stated "... the physical infrastructure of missions, government institutions and children's homes was often very poor and resources were insufficient to improve them or to keep the children adequately clothed, fed, and sheltered".

In reality, during this period removal of the mixed-race children was related to the fact that most were offspring of domestic servants working on pastoral farms, and their removal allowed the mothers to continue working as help on the farm while at the same time removing the whites from responsibility for fathering them and from social stigma for having mixed-race children visible in the home. Also, when they were left alone on the farm they became targets of the men who contributed to the rise in the population of mixed-race children. The institutional racism was government policy gone awry, one that allowed babies to be taken from their mothers at birth, and this continued for most of the 20th century. That it was policy and kept secret for over 60 years is a mystery that no agency has solved to date.

In the 1930s, the Northern Territory Protector of Natives, Cecil Cook, perceived the continuing rise in numbers of "half-caste" children as a problem. His proposed solution was:
"Generally by the fifth and invariably by the sixth generation, all native characteristics of the Australian Aborigine are eradicated. The problem of our half-castes will quickly be eliminated by the complete disappearance of the black race, and the swift submergence of their progeny in the white". He did suggest at one point that they be all sterilised.

Similarly, the Chief Protector of Aborigines in Western Australia, A. O. Neville, wrote in an article for The West Australian in 1930: "Eliminate in future the full-blood and the white and one common blend will remain. Eliminate the full-blood and permit the white admixture and eventually, the race will become white".

Official policy then concentrated on removing all Black people from the population, to the extent that the full-blooded Aboriginal people were hunted to extinguish them from society, and those of mixed race would be assimilated with the white race so that in a few generations they too would become white.

By 1900 the recorded First Nations Australian population had declined to approximately 93,000.

Western Australia and Queensland specifically excluded Aboriginal and Torres Strait Islander people from the electoral rolls. The Commonwealth Franchise Act 1902 excluded "Aboriginal natives of Australia, Asia, Africa and Pacific Islands except for New Zealand" from voting unless they were on the roll before 1901.

Land rights returned

In 1981 a land rights conference was held at James Cook University, where Eddie Mabo, a Torres Strait Islander, made a speech to the audience in which he explained the land inheritance system on Murray Island. The significance of this in terms of Australian common law doctrine was taken note of by one of the attendees, a lawyer, who suggested there should be a test case to claim land rights through the court system. Ten years later, five months after Eddie Mabo died, on 3 June 1992, the High Court announced its historic decision, namely overturning the legal doctrine of terra nullius, which was the term applied by the British relating to the continent of Australia – "empty land".

Public interest in the Mabo case had the side effect of throwing the media spotlight on all issues related to Aboriginal people and Torres Strait Islanders in Australia, and most notably the Stolen Generations. The social impacts of forced removal have been measured and found to be quite severe. Although the stated aim of the "resocialisation" program was to improve the integration of Aboriginal people into modern society, a study conducted in Melbourne and cited in the official report found that there was no tangible improvement in the social position of "removed" Aboriginal people as compared to "non-removed", particularly in the areas of employment and post-secondary education.

Most notably, the study indicated that removed Aboriginal people were actually less likely to have completed a secondary education, three times as likely to have acquired a police record and were twice as likely to use illicit drugs. The only notable advantage "removed" Aboriginal people possessed was a higher average income, which the report noted was most likely due to the increased urbanisation of removed individuals, and hence greater access to welfare payments than for Aboriginal people living in remote communities.

First Nations health and employment

In his 2008 address to the houses of parliament apologising for the treatment of the First Nations population, Prime Minister Kevin Rudd made a plea to the health services regarding the disparate treatment in health services. He noted the widening gap between the treatment of First Nations and non-Indigenous Australians, and committed the government to a strategy called "Closing the Gap", admitting to past institutional racism in health services that shortened the life expectancy of the Aboriginal people. Committees that followed up on this outlined broad categories to redress the inequities in life expectancy, educational opportunities and employment. The Australian government also allocated funding to redress the past discrimination. First Nations Australians visit their general practitioners (GPs) and are hospitalised for diabetes, circulatory disease, musculoskeletal conditions, respiratory and kidney disease, mental, ear and eye problems and behavioural problems yet are less likely than non-Indigenous Australians to visit the GP, use a private doctor, or apply for residence in an old age facility. Childhood mortality rates, the gap in educational achievement and lack of employment opportunities were made goals that in a generation should halve the gap. A national "Close the Gap" day was announced for March of each year by the Human Rights Commission.

In 2011, the Australian Institute of Health and Welfare reported that life expectancy had increased since 2008 by 11.5 years for women and 9.7 years for men along with a significant decrease in infant mortality, but it was still 2.5 times higher than for the non-indigenous population. Much of the health woes of the First people could be traced to the availability of transport. Although English was the official language of Australia, many First Australians did not speak it as a primary language, and the lack of printed materials that were translated into the Australian Aboriginal languages and the non-availability of translators formed a barrier to adequate health care for Aboriginal people. By 2015, most of the funding promised to achieve the goals of "Closing the Gap" had been cut, and the national group monitoring the conditions of the First Nations population was not optimistic that the promises of 2008 will be kept. In 2012, the group complained that institutional racism and overt discrimination continued to be issues, and that, in some sectors of government, the UN Declaration on the Rights of Indigenous Peoples was being treated as an aspirational rather that a binding document.

Canada

Indigenous Canadians

The living standard of indigenous peoples in Canada falls far short of those of the non-indigenous, and they, along with other 'visible minorities' remain, as a group, the poorest in Canada. There continue to be barriers to gaining equality with other Canadians of European ancestry. The life expectancy of First Nations people is lower; they have fewer high school graduates, much higher unemployment rates, nearly double the number of infant deaths and significantly greater contact with law enforcement. Their incomes are lower, they enjoy fewer promotions in the workplace and as a group, the younger members are more likely to work reduced hours or weeks each year.

Many in Europe during the 19th century (as reflected in the Imperial Report of the Select Committee on Aborigines), supported the goal put forth by colonial imperialists of 'civilizing' the Native populations. This led to an emphasis on the acquisition of Aboriginal lands in exchange for the putative benefits of European society and their associated Christian religions. British control of Canada (the Crown) began when they exercised jurisdiction over the first nations and it was by Royal Proclamation that the first piece of legislation the British government passed over First Nations citizens assumed control of their lives. It gave recognition to the Indians tribes as First Nations living under Crown protection.

It was after the treaty of Paris in 1763, whereby France ceded all claims in present-day Canada to Britain, that King George III of Great Britain issued a Royal Proclamation specifying how the Indigenous in the crown colony were to be treated. It is the most significant pieces of legislation regarding the Crown's relationship with Aboriginal people. This Royal Proclamation recognized Indian owned lands and reserved to them all use as their hunting grounds. It also established the process by which the Crown could purchase their lands, and also laid out basic principles to guide the Crown when making treaties with the First Nations. The Proclamation made Indian lands transferred by treaty to be Crown property, and stated that indigenous title is a collective or communal rather than a private right so that individuals have no claim to lands where they lived and hunted long prior to European colonization.

Indian Acts

In 1867, the British North America Act made land reserved for Indians a Crown responsibility. In 1876 the first of many Indian Acts passed, each successive one leeched more from the rights of the indigenous as was stated in the first.
The sundry revised Indian Acts (22 times by 2002) solidified the position of Natives as wards of the state, and Indian agents were given discretionary power to control almost every aspect of the lives of the indigenous. It then became necessary to have permission from an Indian agent if Native people wanted to sell crops they had grown and harvested, or wear traditional clothes off the reserves. The Indian Act was also used to deny Indians the right to vote until 1960, and they could not sit on juries.

In 1885, General Middleton after defeating the Metis rebellion introduced the Pass System in western Canada, under which Natives could not leave their reserves without first obtaining a pass from their farming instructors permitting them to do so. While the Indian Act did not give him such powers, and no other legislation allowed the Department of Indian Affairs to institute such a system, and it was known by crown lawyers to be illegal as early as 1892, the Pass System remained in place and was enforced until the early 1930s. As Natives were not permitted at that time to become lawyers, they could not fight it in the courts. Thus was institutional racism externalized as official policy.

When Aboriginals began to press for recognition of their rights and to complain of corruption and abuses of power within the Indian department, the Act was amended to make it an offence for an Aboriginal person to retain a lawyer for the purpose of advancing any claims against the crown.

Métis

Unlike the effect of those Indian treaties in the North-West, which established the reserves for the Indigenous, the protection of Métis lands was not secured by the scrip policy instituted in the 1870s, whereby the crown exchanged a scrip in exchange for a fixed (160–240 acres) grant of land to those of mixed heritage.

Although Section 3 of the 1883 Dominion Lands Act set out this limitation, this was the first mention in the orders-in-council confining the jurisdiction of scrip commissions to ceded Indian territory. However, a reference was first made in 1886 in a draft letter of instructions to Goulet from Burgess. In most cases, the scrip policy did not consider Métis ways of life, did not guarantee their land rights, and did not facilitate any economic or lifestyle transition.  

Most Métis were illiterate and did not know the value of the scrip, and in most cases sold them for instant gratification due to economic need to speculators who undervalued the paper. Needless to say, the process by which they applied for their land was made deliberately arduous.

There was no legislation binding scrip land to the Métis who applied for them, Instead, Métis scrip lands could be sold to anyone, hence alienating any Aboriginal title that may have been vested in those lands. Despite the evident detriment to the Métis, speculation was rampant and done in collusion with the distribution of scrip. While this does not necessarily preclude a malicious intent by the federal government to consciously 'cheat' the Métis, it illustrates their apathy towards the welfare of the Métis, their long-term interests, and the recognition of their Aboriginal title. But the point of the policy was to settle land in the North-West with agriculturalists, not keep a land reserve for the Métis. Scrip, then, was a major undertaking in Canadian history, and its importance as both an Aboriginal policy and a land policy should not be overlooked as it was an institutional 'policy' that discriminated against ethnic indigenous to their continued detriment.

Enfranchisement

Until 1951, the various Indian Acts defined a 'person' as "an individual other than an Indian", and all indigenous peoples were considered wards of the state. Legally, the Crown devised a system of enfranchisement whereby an indigenous person could become a "person" in Canadian law. Indigenous people could gain the right to vote and become Canadian citizens, "persons" under the law, by voluntarily assimilating into European/Canadian society.

It was hoped that indigenous peoples would renounce their native heritage and culture and embrace the 'benefits' of civilized society. Indeed, from the 1920s to the 1940s some Natives did give up their status to receive the right to go to school, vote, or drink. However, voluntary enfranchisement proved a failure when few natives took advantage.

In 1920, a law was passed to authorize enfranchisement without consent, and many Aboriginal peoples were involuntarily enfranchised. Natives automatically lost their Indian status under this policy and also if they became professionals such as doctors or ministers, or even if they obtained university degrees, and with it, their right to reside on the reserves.

The enfranchisement requirements particularly discriminated against Native women, specifying in Section 12 (1)(b) of the Indian Act that an Indian status woman marrying a non-Indian man would lose her status as an Indian, as would her children. In contrast non-Indian women marrying Indian men would gain Indian status. Duncan Campbell Scott, the Deputy Superintendent of Indian Affairs, neatly expressed the sentiment of the day in 1920:
"Our object is to continue until there is not a single Indian in Canada that has not been absorbed into the body politic, and there is no Indian question and no Indian Department"
This aspect of enfranchisement was addressed by passage of Bill C-31 in 1985, where the discriminatory clause of the Indian Act was removed, and Canada officially gave up the goal of enfranchising Natives.

Residential schools

In the 19th and 20th centuries, the Canadian federal government's Indian Affairs Department officially encouraged the growth of the Indian residential school system as an agent in a wider policy of assimilating Native Canadians into European-Canadian society. This policy was enforced with the support of various Christian churches, who ran many of the schools. Over the course of the system's existence, approximately 30% of native children, roughly some 150,000, were placed in residential schools nationally, with the last school closing in 1996. There has long been controversy about the conditions experienced by students in the residential schools. While day schools for First Nations, Metis, and Inuit children always far outnumbered residential schools, a new consensus emerged in the early 21st century that the latter schools did significant harm to Aboriginal children who attended them by removing them from their families, depriving them of their ancestral languages, undergoing forced sterilization for some students, and by exposing many of them to physical and sexual abuse by staff members, and other students, and dis-enfranchising them forcibly.

With the goal of civilizing and Christianizing Aboriginal populations, a system of 'industrial schools' was developed in the 19th century that combined academic studies with "more practical matters" and schools for Natives began to appear in the 1840s. From 1879 on these schools were modelled after the Carlisle Indian School in Pennsylvania, whose motto was "Kill the Indian in him and save the man". It was felt that the most effective weapon for "killing the Indian" in them, was to remove children from their Native supports and so Native children were taken away from their homes, their parent, their families, friends and communities.
The 1876 Indian Act gave the federal government responsibility for Native education and by 1910 residential schools dominated the Native education policy. The government provided funding to religious groups such as the Catholic, Anglican, United Church and Presbyterian churches to undertake Native education. By 1920, attendance by natives was made compulsory and there were 74 residential schools operating nationwide. Following the ideas of Sifton and others like him, the academic goals of these schools were "dumbed down". As Duncan Campbell Scott stated at the time, they did not want students that were "made too smart for the Indian villages":
"To this end the curriculum in residential schools has been simplified and the practical instruction given is such as may be immediately of use to the pupil when he returns to the reserve after leaving school."

The funding the government provided was generally insufficient and often the schools ran themselves as "self-sufficient businesses", where 'student workers' were removed from class to do the laundry, heat the building, or perform farm work. Dormitories were often poorly heated and overcrowded, and the food was less than adequately nutritious. A 1907 report, commissioned by Indian Affairs, found that in 15 prairie schools there was a death rate of 24%. Indeed, a deputy superintendent general of Indian Affairs at the time commented:
"It is quite within the mark to say that fifty percent of the children who passed through these schools did not benefit from the education which they had received therein."
While the death rate did decline in later years, death would remain a part of the residential school tradition. The author of that report to the BNA, Dr. P.H. Bryce, was later removed and in 1922 published a pamphlet that came close to calling the governments indifference to the conditions of the Indians in the schools 'manslaughter'.

Anthropologists Steckley and Cummins note that the endemic abuses – emotional, physical, and sexual – for which the system is now well known for "might readily qualify as the single-worst thing that Europeans did to Natives in Canada". Punishments were often brutal and cruel, sometimes even life-threatening or life-ending. Pins were sometimes stuck in children's tongues for speaking their Native languages, sick children were made to eat their vomit, and semi-formal inspections of children's genitalia were carried out. The term Sixties Scoop (or Canada Scoops) refers to the Canadian practice, beginning in the 1960s and continuing until the late 1980s, of taking ("scooping up") children of Aboriginal peoples in Canada from their families for placing in foster homes or adoption.

Most residential schools closed in the 1970s, with the last one closing in 1996. Criminal and civil suits against the government and the churches began in the late 1980s and shortly thereafter the last residential school closed. By 2002 the number of lawsuits had passed 10,000. In the 1990s, beginning with the United Church, the churches that ran the residential schools began to issue formal apologies. And in 1998 the Canadian government issued the Statement of Reconciliation, and committed $350 million in support of a community-based healing strategy to address the healing needs of individuals, families and communities arising from the legacy of physical and sexual abuse at residential schools. The money was used to launch the Aboriginal Healing Foundation.

Starting in the 1990s, the government started a number of initiatives to address the effects of the Indian residential school. In March 1998, the government made a Statement of Reconciliation and established the Aboriginal Healing Foundation. In the fall of 2003, the Alternative Dispute Resolution process was launched, which was a process outside of court providing compensation and psychological support for former students of residential schools who were physically or sexually abused or were in situations of wrongful confinement. On 11 June 2008, Prime Minister Stephen Harper issued a formal apology on behalf of the sitting Cabinet and in front of an audience of Aboriginal delegates. A Truth and Reconciliation Commission ran from 2008 through to 2015 to document past wrongdoing in the hope of resolving conflict left over from the past. The final report concluded that the school system amounted to cultural genocide.

Contemporary situation

The overt institutional racism of the past has clearly had a profoundly devastating and lasting effect on visible minorities and Aboriginal communities throughout Canada. European cultural norms have imposed themselves on Native populations in Canada, and Aboriginal communities continue to struggle with foreign systems of governance, justice, education, and livelihood. Visible Minorities struggle with education, employment and negative contact with the legal system across Canada.

Perhaps most palpable is the dysfunction and familial devastation caused by residential schools. Hutchins states; "Many of those who attended residential schools have been diagnosed with post-traumatic stress disorder, suffering from such symptoms as panic attacks, insomnia, and uncontrollable or unexplainable anger. Many also suffer from alcohol or drug abuse, sexual inadequacy or addiction, the inability to form intimate relationships, and eating disorders. Three generations of Native parents lost out on learning important parenting skills usually passed on from parent to child in caring and nurturing home environments, and the abuse suffered by students of residential schools has begun a distressing cycle of abuse within many Native communities." The lasting legacy of residential schools is but only one facet of the problem.

The Hutchins report continues: "Aboriginal children continue to struggle with mainstream education in Canada. For some Indian students, English remains a second language, and many lack parents with sufficient education themselves to support them. Moreover, schooling in Canada is based on an English written tradition, which is different from the oral traditions of the Native communities. For others, it is simply that they are ostracised for their 'otherness'; their manners, their attitudes, their speech, or a hundred other things which mark them out as different.
"Aboriginal populations continue to suffer from poor health. They have seven years less life expectancy than the overall Canadian population and almost twice as many infant deaths. While Canada as a nation routinely ranks in the top three on the United Nations Human Development Index, its on-reserve Aboriginal population, if scored as a nation, would rank a distant and shocking sixty-third."

As Perry Bellegarde National Chief, Assembly of First Nations, points out, racism in Canada today is for the most part, a covert operation. Its central and most distinguishing tenet is the vigour with which it is consistently denied. There are many who argue that Canada's endeavors in the field of human rights and its stance against racism have only resulted in a "more politically correct population who have learnt to better conceal their prejudices". In effect, the argument is that racism in Canada is not being eliminated, but rather is becoming more covert, more rational, and perhaps more deeply imbedded in our institutions.

That racism is alive is evidenced by the recent referendum in British Columbia by which the provincial government is asking the white majority to decide on a mandate for negotiating treaties with the Indian minority. The results of the referendum will be binding, the government having legislatively committed itself to act on these principles if more than 50% of those voting reply in the same way. Moreover, although it has been revised many times, "the Indian Act remains legislation which singles out a segment of society based on race". Under it, the civil rights of First Nations peoples are "dealt with in a different manner than the civil rights of the rest of Canadian citizens".

The Aboriginal Justice Inquiry in Manitoba, the Donald Marshall Inquiry in Nova Scotia, the Cawsey Report in Alberta and the Royal Commission of Aboriginal People all agree, as far as Aboriginal people are concerned, racism in Canadian society continues institutionally, systematically, and individually.

In 2020, after the death of Joyce Echaquan, the Prime Minister of Canada, Justin Trudeau, had recognized a case of systemic racism.

In 2022, Pope Francis visited Canada for a week-long tour called a  “pilgrimage of penance.” Vatican officials called the trip a “penitential pilgrimage”. The Pope was welcomed in Edmonton where he apologized for Indigenous abuse which took place in the 20th century at Catholic run residential schools which have since closed. During his stay he met with Indigenous groups to address the scandal of the residential schools. “I am sorry,” The Pope said, and asked forgiveness for the church and church members in “projects of cultural destruction and forced assimilation” and the systematic abuse and erasure of indigenous culture in the country’s residential schools.

Anti-Chinese immigration laws
The Canadian government passed the Chinese Immigration Act of 1885 levying a $50 head tax upon all Chinese people immigrating to Canada. When the 1885 act failed to deter Chinese immigration, the Canadian government then passed the Chinese Immigration Act, 1900, increasing the head tax to $100, and, upon that act failing, passed the Chinese Immigration Act, 1904 increasing the head tax (landing fee) to $500, equivalent to $8000 in 2003 – when compared to the head tax – Right of Landing Fee and Right of Permanent Residence Fee – of $975 per person, paid by new immigrants in 1995–2005 decade, which then was reduced to $490 in 2006.

The Chinese Immigration Act, 1923, better known as the "Chinese Exclusion Act", replaced prohibitive fees with a ban on ethnic Chinese immigrating to Canada – excepting merchants, diplomats, students, and "special circumstance" cases. The Chinese who entered Canada before 1923 had to register with the local authorities, and could leave Canada only for two years or less. Since the Exclusion Act went into effect on 1 July 1923, Chinese-Canadians referred to Canada Day (Dominion Day) as "Humiliation Day", refusing to celebrate it until the Act's repeal in 1947.

Black Canadians

China 

Institutional racism exists in many domains in the People's Republic of China, though certain scholars have noted the Chinese government's portrayal of racism as a Western problem, while intentionally ignoring or downplaying the existence of widespread systemic racism in China.

The United Nations Committee on the Elimination of Racial Discrimination reported in 2018 that Chinese law does not define racial discrimination.

Local ethnic minorities

Uyghurs

Under the leadership of China's Paramount Leader and Communist Party general secretary Xi Jinping, the Uyghurs – a mostly Muslim ethnic minority group living in the Chinese Xinjiang Uygur Autonomous Region – have faced widespread persecution from authorities and mass detentions. Since 2017, it has been reported that least 1 million Uyghur Muslims have been detained in "re-education camps" commonly described as concentration camps, where they have been subject to torture, forced labor, religious discrimination, political indoctrination and other human rights abuses. Testimonials from escaped inmates have indicated inmates are subject to forced sterilization. 

Birth rates in two Xinjiang regions have dropped by more than 60% between 2015 and 2018, a result of measures by the Chinese government to lower the Uyghur population artificially. The situation has been described as an ongoing genocide by numerous sources, and others have argued that it is likely the "largest mass detention of a religious minority group" since the Holocaust according to the New Statesman. A study from 2013 found local government officials in China "were 33 percent less likely to provide assistance to citizens with ethnic Muslim names than to ethnically-unmarked peers."

Tibetans

Since the People's Republic of China gained control of Tibet in 1951, there has been institutional racism in the form of an elaborate propaganda system designed by the Chinese Communist Party to portray Tibetans as being liberated from serfdom through China and Han Chinese culture. A state-organized historical opera performed in 2016 in China portrayed Tibet as being unsophisticated prior to Princess Wencheng's marriage to Songtsen Gampo, a Tibetan emperor, in the year 641. This propaganda is described by Tibetan activist Tsering Woeser as being a "...vast project that rewrites history and 'wipes out' the memory and culture of an entire people."

A 1991 journal article identified how forced abortion, sterilization, and infanticide in Tibet were all part of a severe CCP birth control program in the region, designed specifically to target Tibetans.

A paper submitted to the United Nations Committee on the Elimination of Racial Discrimination by the Tibetan government in exile stipulates about how Tibetans face an education system which is inequitable compared with the education for Han Chinese. According to the paper, only about nine percent of Chinese adults are illiterate, compared with about sixty percent of Tibetans in the Tibetan Autonomous Region. Furthermore, Tibetan children are prevented from learning about their own history and culture, and forbidden to learn their own language. Schools in the region often have racial segregation based on ethnic characteristics, with Tibetan students receiving worse education in poorly-maintained classrooms.

During the 2008 Tibet protests, a local eyewitness claimed Chinese military police "were grabbing monks, kicking and beating them" after riots around the closure of the Sera monastery near Lhasa.

Anti-African sentiment
Racism against African people or people perceived to be of African descent has long been documented in China.

Published in 1963, African student Emmanuel Hevi's An African Student in China details "the arrests of Chinese girls for their friendships with Africans, and particularly, Chinese feelings of racial superiority over black Africans." One notable instance was the Nanjing anti-African protests of 1988, in which African university students were the subject of racist beatings and other attacks. In some cases, Chinese university students shouted racist slogans such as Down with the black devils!' and 'Blood for blood! Despite these obvious instances of racism against Africans, the Chinese state media portrayed the attacks as being instigated by the African students.

In modern China, racism remains an issue in certain universities, such as the state-funded Zhejiang Normal University. A black graduate student described how "African students would hear Professors and classmates make xenophobic comments, such as 'Africans are draining our scholarship funds and how African students, despite having higher grades, were receiving lower level scholarship funds through the ZJNU's three-tiered scholarship system than their classmates.

One study noted how Africans were being portrayed as "waste" and "triple illegals" through racial profiling by police in Guangzhou. In 2007, African nationals were targeted in Beijing's Sanlitun district by police during an anti-drug raid. They were the victims of police brutality and targeted on the basis of their skin color, something which the police later denied.

State media reports from 2008 referred to Africans in a racist manner, as Cheng explains: "...[the] language often remained demeaning regarding Africans as much less civilized people. Chinese words such as 部落 (buluo, "tribes") or 聚居地/ 群居/群落 (jujudi/qunju/qunluo, habitats), instead of 社区 (shequ, community) were often used to refer to Africans."

Yinghong Cheng asserts in a 2011 journal article that "Cyber racism against Africans is certainly not the only racial thinking but it is perhaps the most explicit and blatant one." He details the ubiquity of "manifestations of racial stereotypes, hierarchy perception and insensitivity", in addition to how "systematic discourse of race has developed in much more articulate, sophisticated and explicit ways in education and pop culture to accommodate contemporary Chinese nationalism." The adoption of a more state capitalist form of government in the PRC has led to the widespread internet popularity of commercialized Chinese singers and songwriters, some of whose material is racial in subject matter. As Cheng notes: The Yellow Race' (Huangzhongren 黄种人) and 'Yellow' (Huang 黄), [were] created in 2006 and 2007 respectively and dedicated to China's hosting of the Olympics. The racist language in these songs, such as 'the Yellow Race is now marching on the world,' combined with nationalist claims such as 'After 5,000 years, finally it is the time for us to show up on the stage,' coloured Xie's popularity among his young Chinese fans." 

In 2018, CCTV New Year's Gala, a state media television programme which has in the past been viewed by up to 800 million people included a racist neocolonial skit featuring a Chinese actress who wore blackface makeup. The skit "praises Chinese-African cooperation, showing how much Africans benefit from Chinese investment and how grateful they are to Beijing." Later the same year, the Daily Monitor reported that citizens of Uganda and Nigeria were discriminated against in Guangzhou by the Chinese government, through incidents such as taxis being halted and passports from African countries being confiscated, as well as hotels and restaurants being ordered to erect notices banning service to Africans. In addition, some African-owned stores were forcibly shut down.

During the COVID-19 pandemic, multiple instances of systemic racism against African people were documented, including misinformation and racist stereotyping which portrayed Africans as carriers of the virus. According to The Guardian, Africans were "refused entry by hospitals, hotels, supermarkets, shops and food outlets. At one hospital, even a pregnant woman was denied access. In a McDonald's restaurant, a notice was put up saying 'black people cannot come in. The local government in Guangzhou implemented mass surveillance, compulsory testing, and enforced a 14-day quarantine for all African nationals, regardless of whether they had traveled outside of China in the past two weeks.

Anti-Japanese sentiment

Anti-Japanese sentiment exists as a modern issue in China, largely due to historical grievances. There have been reports of restaurants and public institutions refusing service or entry to Japanese people, which stems especially due to the Second Sino-Japanese War which had included Japanese war crimes such as the Nanjing massacre and Unit 731.

In recent years, there has been joint communiqués between the leaders of these two countries to try and mend as well as improve relations with each other.

Malaysia

Malaysians of Chinese and Indian descent – who make up a significant portion of ethnic minorities in Malaysia, with them making up around 23.2% and 7.0% of the population respectively – were granted citizenship by the Malaysian Constitution but this implied a social contract that left them at a disadvantage and discriminated in other ways, as Article 153 of the Constitution of Malaysia refers to the special "position" and "privileges" of the Muslim Malay people as supposed initial dwellers of the land.

Malay supremacy
However, due to the concept of Ketuanan Melayu (lit. Malay supremacy), a citizen that is not considered to be of Bumiputera status face many roadblocks and discrimination in matters such as economic freedom, education, healthcare and housing. Opposition groups, government critics and human rights observers has labeled the Malaysian situation as being highly similar to apartheid policies due to their status as de facto second-class citizens. Such policies has also led to a significant brain drain from the country.

In 1970, the Malaysian New Economic Policy a program of affirmative action aimed at increasing the share of the economy held by the Malay population, introduced quotas for Malays in areas such as public education, access to housing, vehicle imports, government contracts and share ownership. Initially meant as a measure to curb the poor economic participation of the Malays, aimed to reduce the number of hardcore poor Malays, it is now perceived by most conservative Malays as a form of entitlement or 'birthright'. In post-modern Malaysia, this entitlement in political, legislative, monarchy, religious, education, social, and economic areas has led to lower productivity and lower competitiveness among the Malays. 

As for the elite Malays, this 'privilege' has been abused to the point where the poor Malays remain poor, while the rich Malays becomes richer; which is the result of Malay cronyism, non-competitive and non-transparent government project tender processes favouring Bumiputera candidates – causing deeper intra-ethnic inequality. However, the actual indigenous people or better known as Orang Asli remain marginalised and have their rights ignored by the Malaysian government. Since Article 160 defines a Malay as "professing the religion of Islam", those eligible to benefit from laws assisting bumiputra are, in theory, subject to religious law enforced by the parallel Syariah Court system.

While 179 countries around the world have ratified the International Convention on the Elimination of All Forms of Racial Discrimination (ICERD), Malaysia is also not one of them. The Pakatan Harapan (PH) government that replaced Barisan Nasional (BN) from 2018 to 2020 had indicated a readiness to ratify ICERD, but has yet to do so due to the convention's conflict with the Malaysian constitution and the race and religious norms in Malaysia established since its independence. Furthermore, a mass rally was held in 2018 by Malay supremacists at the country's capital to prevent such ratification, threatening racial conflicts if they do so. The PH government would eventually lose power amid the 2020–2022 Malaysian political crisis to BN.

Nigeria

Indigeneity
Nigeria contains over 250 ethnic groups, but the country is politically dominated by three major ethnic groups – the Hausa-Fulani of the north, the Igbo of the southeast, and the Yoruba of the southwest. National politics in Nigeria have largely revolved around competition between the three dominant ethnic groups, with the minority ethnic groups having less political representation.

The Nigerian constitution promises equality among all ethnic groups, but in actuality, the concept of "indigeneity" is widespread across local and state governments (and to a lesser extent, the federal government), which has been criticized by Human Rights Watch as a form of discrimination and a violation of international human rights law. Citizens are recognized as "indigenes" of a particular locality if they belong to an ethnic group that is considered to be indigenous to that locality. Citizens from other ethnic groups, regardless of how long they or their families have been living in a locality, are legally recognized as non-indigenes and they face discrimination from government laws that limit their socioeconomic mobility. 

Public universities in Nigeria favour indigenes during the admissions process, and non-indigenes are subject to discriminatory admissions policies that attempt to limit the number of non-indigene students. Non-indigene students are required to pay higher tuition and they are denied academic scholarships. Non-indigenes are often unable to participate in local politics and they are also excluded from government jobs. In some cases, non-indigenes have faced mass purges from government jobs in order to create more jobs for indigenes.

Human Rights Watch has claimed the indigeneity policies relegate "millions of Nigerians to the status of second-class citizens". Nigerian Vice President Yemi Osinbajo compared indigeneity policies to apartheid.

Niger Delta ethnic minorities

Nigeria is an oil-rich country where much of its oil resources can be found in the Niger Delta region, which is inhabited by ethnic minorities such as the Ogoni and Ijaw. The native inhabitants of the Niger Delta do not receive much of the wealth generated by Nigeria's vast oil industry, and it is paradoxically one of Nigeria's poorest regions. Oil wealth has been used to develop other parts of Nigeria while the Niger Delta region itself remains underdeveloped. The Niger Delta is constantly polluted and destroyed by the activities of both the Nigerian government and oil companies such as Shell Nigeria and Chevron Nigeria. Struggle for oil wealth has fueled violence in the Niger Delta, causing the militarization of nearly the entire region by ethnic militia groups and Nigerian military and police forces.

The Ijaw and Ogoni people have been subject to human rights violations in the form of environmental destruction and pollution. A 1979 amendment to the Nigerian constitution gave the federal government the authority to seize and distribute Ogoni territory to oil companies without any compensation. In 1990, the Movement for the Survival of the Ogoni People was founded by Ogoni activist Ken Saro-Wiwa to seek self-determination for the Ogoni people, compensation for environmental destruction, and payment of royalties from oil production. In 1995, he was arrested and executed, along with nine other Ogoni activists, by the regime of the Nigerian military dictator Sani Abacha, which was internationally condemned as a violation of human rights.

While the Nigerian government has become more democratic ever since the death of Sani Abacha, the ethnic groups in the Niger Delta still lack representation and remain excluded from the mainstream of Nigerian politics, economy and society. Government security forces in the Delta region regularly engage in torture, killings and confiscation of property as a result of the Conflict in the Niger Delta. The Unrepresented Nations and Peoples Organization condemned the Nigerian government for its discrimination against the Ogoni people and failure to clean environmental pollution from the Niger Delta region.

Osu

The Igbo people traditionally maintain a system of discrimination from the Odinani religion that discriminates against a class of people known as Osu (Igbo: outcast). Osu are regarded to be spiritually inferior beings, and they are distinguished from Nwadiala or diala (Igbo: real born). They are ostracized from wider society and Igbo are discouraged from marrying them. They were historically either sold into slavery or were delivered to be enslaved to certain deities who were believed to ask for human sacrifice during festivals in order to clean the land from abomination, thus leading to the purchase of a slave by the people.

The status of Osu is permanent and inherited at birth.  Despite influence from colonialism and Christianity, discrimination against Osu still persists in the modern day.  In modern times, Osu are often barred from marriage, traditional leadership positions, and running from political office.

According to some human rights groups who are calling for its abolishment, some of the punishments meted out against the Osu include: parents administering poison to their children, disinheritance, ostracism, denial of membership in social clubs, violent disruption of marriage ceremonies, denial of chieftaincy titles, deprivation of property and expulsion of wives.

South Africa
In South Africa, during apartheid, institutional racism has been a powerful means of excluding from resources and power any person not categorized or marked as a white. Those marked as black were further discriminated against differentially, with Africans facing more extreme forms of exclusion and exploitation than those marked as Coloured or Indian. One such example of institutional racism in South Africa is Natives Land Act, 1913, which reserved 90% of land for white use and the Native Urban Areas Act of 1923 controlled access to urban areas, which suited commercial farmers who were keen to hold labour on their land. Africans, who formed the majority of the population, were relegated to (often barren) rural reserves, which later became homelands.

More modern forms of institutional racism in South Africa are centered around interracial relationships and official government policy. Opposition to interracial intimate relationships may be indicative of underlying racism, and that conversely acceptance and support of these relationships may be indicative of a stance against racism. Even though the prohibition of Mixed Marriages Act was repealed in 1985, the term "mixed" continued to exists, thus carrying forth the inherent stigmatization of "mixed" relationships and race. Consequently, discourse is a framework that realizes that language can produce institutional structures and relations. However, language constitutes who we are, how we interact with others and how we understand ourselves. Therefore, discourse is said to be inextricably linked to power and more than just a medium used to transmit information.

Furthermore, post-apartheid racism is still rife in South Africa, both black-on-white and white-on-black, with white-on-black racism being more advertised in the news. In 2015, black staff at a restaurant near Stellenbosch allegedly were verbally attacked and degraded by a group of white students. In response, a black student declared that everyone who did not speak Afrikaans in the area was an alien in the area. "They were whistling at them as they were whistling at dogs," he claimed. He further claimed that the white students even leapt over the counter and patted them as if they were dogs. Three white men and four other young white men allegedly followed him outside after he left the restaurant and assaulted him. The University of Stellenbosch did not continue with disciplinary action which shows the racism in academic institutions.

The South African government has done things to combat racial economic disparity in South Africa for example, BEE (Black Economic Empowerment) is a South African government programme aimed at facilitating black people's fuller participation in the economy, particularly to address imbalances established by apartheid. It offers incentives to businesses that contribute to black economic empowerment through a variety of measurable criteria, such as partial or majority black ownership, hiring black employees, and contracting with black-owned suppliers, as well as preferential treatment in government procurement processes. BEE's preferential procurement feature has been hailed as a model for a long-term procurement strategy in which government procurement is used to accomplish social policy goals.

United Kingdom

In the monarchy

In the Metropolitan Police Service

In the United Kingdom, the inquiry about the murder of the Black Briton Stephen Lawrence concluded that the investigating police force was institutionally racist. Sir William Macpherson used the term as a description of "the collective failure of an organisation to provide an appropriate and professional service to people because of their colour, culture, or ethnic origin", which "can be seen or detected in processes, attitudes, and behaviour, which amount to discrimination through unwitting prejudice, ignorance, thoughtlessness, and racist stereotyping, which disadvantages minority ethnic people". Sir William's definition is almost identical to Stokely Carmichael's original definition some forty years earlier. Stokely Carmichael and Charles Hamilton were Black Power activists and first used the term 'institutional racism' in 1967 to describe the consequences of a societal structure that was stratified into a racial hierarchy that resulted in layers of discrimination and inequality for minority ethnic people in housing, income, employment, education and health (Garner 2004:22).

The Stephen Lawrence Inquiry Report, and the public's response to it, were among the major factors that forced the Metropolitan Police to address its treatment of ethnic minorities. More recently, the former Metropolitan Police Commissioner, Sir Ian Blair said that the British news media are institutionally racist, a comment that offended journalists, provoking angry responses from the media, despite the National Black Police Association welcoming Blair's assessment.

The report also found that the Metropolitan Police was institutionally racist. A total of 70 recommendations for reform were made. These proposals included abolishing the double jeopardy rule and criminalising racist statements made in private. Macpherson also called for reform in the British Civil Service, local governments, the National Health Service, schools, and the judicial system, to address issues of institutional racism.

In June 2015, the Metropolitan Police Commissioner, Sir Bernard Hogan-Howe, said there was some justification in claims that the Metropolitan Police Service is institutionally racist.

In criminal convictions
In the English and Welsh prison system, government data which was compiled in 2020 showed that youths of color are dis-proportionally subject to punishment the UN regards as violating the Mandela Rules on the treatment of prisoners. The COVID-19 pandemic had caused some minors being held in pre-trial detention to be placed in solitary confinement indefinitely. Minorities under 18 comprised 50% of the youth inmates held and 27% of the overall prison population. Ethnic minorities made up 14% of the overall population.

In healthcare
Institutional racism exists in various aspects of healthcare, from maternity to psychiatric. Black women are four times more likely to die in pregnancy, labour and up to a year postpartum than whites.

Asian women are twice as likely as whites to die in pregnancy. Black women are twice as likely to have a stillborn baby than whites.

According to the Institute for the Study of Academic Racism, scholars have drawn on a 1979 work by social psychologist Michael Billig – "Psychology, Racism, and Fascism" – that identified links between the Institute of Psychiatry and racist/eugenic theories, notably in regard to race and intelligence, as for example promoted by IOP psychologist Hans Eysenck and in a highly publicised talk in August 1970 at the IOP by American psychologist Arthur Jensen. Billig concluded that "racialist presuppositions" intruded into research at the Institute both unintentionally and intentionally. In 2007, the BBC reported that a "race row" had broken out in the wake of an official inquiry that identified institutional racism in British psychiatry, with psychiatrists, including from the IOP/Maudsley, arguing against the claim, while the heads of the Mental Health Act Commission accused them of misunderstanding the concept of institutional racism and dismissing the legitimate concerns of the black community in Britain. Campaigns by voluntary groups seek to address the higher rates of sectioning, overmedication, misdiagnosis and forcible restraint on members of minority groups. According to 2014 statistics, Black adults had the lowest treatment rate of any ethnic group, at 5.2%. The treatment rate for whites is 17.3%. Figures from March 2019 show that Black people were more than four times as likely as white people to be detained under the Mental Health Act in the previous year.

Black men were 4.2 times more likely, and Black women were 4.3 times more likely, to die from COVID-19 than whites during the initial wave of the pandemic.

In education

In a 2009 report by the Department for Innovations and Business Skills, it was found that Black students were the most likely to receive under-predicted grades by their teachers. It was found that 8.1% of Black students received higher actual grades compared to 4.6% of white students, 6.5% of Asian students and 6.1% of mixed-race students.

Critics contend that part of the institutional racism in education in the UK is in the curriculum. Arguments for and against decolonizing the curriculum are outlined on the BBC's Moral Maze podcast.

In employment
The equality and human rights commission reported that black workers with degrees earned 27.1% less income on average than whites. This gives some light for the reasons behind the stark inequalities that black people and to a lesser extent, other ethnic minorities face in the UK. For example, 56% of families with a black household head were living in poverty compared to 13% of families led by a white person.

Standards of employment in the UK, as well as in the United States and other Western European countries, often disregard how certain standards, such as eye contact, have different meanings around the world. Asian, Latin American and African cultures can consider eye contact as disrespect or as challenging authority, often resulting in them maintaining an on-and-off eye contact to show respect in interviews and employment processes. Opposingly, most people in countries in North America and Western Europe see eye contact as expressing enthusiasm and trust.

United States

In housing and lending 

Institutional racism in the housing sector could be seen as early as the 1930s with the Home Owners' Loan Corporation. Banks would determine a neighborhood's risk for loan default and redline neighborhoods that were at high risk of crime. These neighborhoods tended to be African-American neighborhoods, whereas whites were able to receive housing loans. Over several decades, as whites left the city to move to nicer houses in the suburbs, predominantly African-American neighborhoods fell apart. Retail stores also started moving to the suburbs to be closer to the customers and to avoid being robbed. Commencing with President Franklin D. Roosevelt's New Deal in the 1930s and through the 1960s, the FHA contributed to the economic growth of the white population by providing loan guarantees to banks, which in turn financed white homeownership and enabled white flight, and it did not make loans available to Black people. As minorities were not able to get financing and aid from banks, whites pulled ahead in equity gains. Moreover, many college students were then, in turn, financed with the equity in homeownership that was gained by having gotten the earlier government handout, which was not the same accorded to Black and other minority families. The institutional racism of the FHA's 1943 model has been tempered after the Great Recession by President Barack Obama's efforts to stabilize the housing losses of 2008 with his Fair Housing Finance (GSE) reform.

These changes, which were brought on by government-funded programs and projects, have led to a significant change in inner-city markets. Due to robberies, black neighborhoods have been left with fewer food stores, but more liquor stores. The low-income neighborhoods are left with independently owned smaller grocery stores that tend to have higher prices. Poor consumers are left with the option of traveling to middle-income neighborhoods, or spending more for less.

The racial segregation and disparities in wealth between European Americans and African-American people include legacies of historical policies. In the Social Security Act of 1935, agricultural workers and servants, who disproportionately were Black, were excluded because key whites did not want governmental assistance to change the agrarian system. In the Wagner Act of 1935, "blacks were blocked by law from challenging the barriers to entry into the newly protected labor unions and securing the right to collective bargaining." In the National Housing Act of 1939, the property appraisal system tied property value and eligibility for government loans to race. The 1936 Underwriting Manual used by the Federal Housing Administration to guide residential mortgages gave 20% weight to a neighborhood's protection, for example, zoning ordinances, deed restrictions, high speed traffic arteries, from adverse influences, such as infiltration of inharmonious racial groups. Thus, white-majority neighborhoods received the government's highest property value ratings, and whites were eligible for government loans and aid. Richard Rothstein, in his book "The Color of Law," tells of a history of residential segregation in America. He noted that government institutions in all branches and at all levels and were complicit in excluding African Americans from home-ownership. "We have created a caste system in this country, with African Americans kept exploited and geographically separate by racially explicit government policies," he wrote. In covering topics like racial covenants – where loans to developers were contingent on contracts that spelled out specific exclusion of black people, he showed that it was a policy spelled out by the Federal Housing Administration's underwriting manual, which denied any guarantees for a federal bank loan to a developer if they were to sell properties to African Americans in white communities. Homeowners in one such subdivision, Levittown, Long Island, New York, were forbidden to rent or sell to persons "other than members of the Caucasian race". Between 1934 and 1962, less than two percent of government-subsidized housing went to non-white people.

In 1968, the Fair Housing Act (FHA) was signed into law to eliminate the effects of state-sanctioned racial segregation. But it failed to change the status quo as the United States remained nearly segregated as in the 1960s. A newer discriminating lending practice was the subprime lending in the 1990s. Lenders targeted high-interest subprime loans to low-income and minority neighborhoods who might be eligible for fair-interest prime loans. Securitization, mortgage brokers and other non-deposit lenders, and legislative deregulation of the mortgage lending industry all played a role in promoting the subprime lending market.

Numerous audit studies conducted in the 1980s in the United States found consistent evidence of discrimination against African Americans and Hispanics in metropolitan housing markets.

The long-outlawed practice of redlining (in which banks choke off lending to minority communities) recently re-emerged as a concern for federal bank regulators in New York and Connecticut. A settlement with the Justice Department and the Consumer Financial Protection Bureau was the largest in the history of both agencies, topping $33 million in restitution for the practice from New Jersey's largest savings bank. The bank had been accused of steering clear of higher crime neighborhoods and favoring whites in granting loans and mortgages, finding that, of the approximately 1,900 mortgages made in 2014, only 25 went to black applicants. The banks' executives denied bias, and the settlement came with adjustments to the banks' business practices. This followed other successful efforts by the federal, state and city officials in 2014 to expand lending programs directed at minorities, and in some cases to force banks to pay penalties for patterns of redlining in Providence, Rhode Island; St. Louis, Missouri; Milwaukee, Wisconsin; and Buffalo and Rochester, New York. The Justice Department also has more active redlining investigations underway, and officials have stated to reporters that "redlining is not a thing of the past". It has evolved, they explained, into a more politically correct version, where bankers do not talk openly about denying loans to black people. The Justice Department officials noted that some banks quietly had institutionalized bias in their operations. They have moved their operations out of minority communities entirely, while others have moved in to fill the void and compete for clients. Such management decisions are not the stated intent, it is left unspoken so that even the bank's other customers are unaware that it is occurring. The effect on minority communities can be profound as home ownership, a prime source of neighborhood stability and economic mobility can affect its vulnerability to blight and disrepair. In the 1960s and 1970s, laws were passed banning the practice; its return is far less overt, and while the vast majority of banks operate legally, the practice appears to be more widespread as the investigation revealed a vast disparity in loans approved for black people as compared to whites in similar situations.

Studies in major cities, such as Los Angeles and Baltimore, show that communities of color have lower levels of access to parks and green space. Parks are considered an environmental amenity and have social, economic, and health benefits. The public spaces allow for social interactions, increase the likelihood of daily exercise in the community and improve mental health. They can also reduce the urban heat island effect, provide wildlife habitat, control floods, and reduce certain air pollutants. Minority groups have less access to decision-making processes that determine the distribution of parks. A recent study published by Suffolk University found that black renters face discrimination when renting compared to similarly situated white renters.

Racism in health care and environmental racism 

Institutional racism impacts health care accessibility within non-white minority communities by creating health disparities among racial groups. For example, from 1865 to 1906, many black veterans were unfairly denied disability pension by the Union Army disability pension system. Racism may also account for disproportionate rates of diseases, such as AIDS, among ethnic minorities. In a 1992 article, Janis Hutchinson argues that the federal government has responded slowly to the AIDS epidemic in minority communities and that their attempts have been insensitive to ethnic diversity in preventive medicine, community health maintenance, and AIDS treatment services. In addition, the mass incarceration of black males along, with vectors for addiction in co-relation to the higher number of minority females found infected with the HIV virus after 2000, has been the subject of study, and findings have shown that previous analyses of the rise incorrectly attributed it to male-on-male sex habits, rather than the causal effects found in current studies. Public health studies found incarcerated men, when returned to their communities, raise the risk of infection by passing the virus on to heterosexual partners, having acquired it in prison due to higher than average rates of sexual assault and rape, no access to condoms, injectable drugs and lack of clean needles, along with tattooing, and inadequate access to health care and treatment after being released due to poverty and unemployment. The studies also found that the high rates of incarceration reduced the number of available men in black communities and rupture social relationships, leading each man to have an increase in the number of concurrent sexual partners.

Institutional racism can affect minority health directly through health-related policies, as well as through other factors indirectly. For example, racial segregation disproportionately exposed black communities to chemical substances such as lead paint, respiratory irritants such as diesel fumes, crowding, litter, and noise. Members of racial minority groups that have a disadvantaged status in education and employment are more likely to be uninsured, which significantly impedes them from accessing preventive, diagnostic, or therapeutic health services.

Racial minorities in the United States are exposed to greater health and environmental risks than the general population. In 1982, there was a proposed polychlorinated biphenyl landfill in an African-American community in Warren County, NC. PCBs are toxic chemicals that can leach into the groundwater and contaminate the drinking water supply. The community resisted and said this was an act of environmental racism. This incident is considered to be the beginning of the environmental justice movement: a movement to address the injustice that communities of color face. Research shows that there is racial discrimination in the enforcement of environmental laws and regulations. People of color and the poor are more likely to live, work and play in America's most polluted environments. Communities of color tend to be disproportionately exposed to lead, pesticides, and petrochemical plants. Unfortunately, race and class is a reliable indicator of where industrial plants and waste facilities are located. Institutional environmental racism encompasses these land use decisions that contribute to health issues such as asthma, obesity and diabetes.

The opioid epidemic in the United States is overwhelmingly white, sparing African-American and Latino communities because doctors unconsciously prescribe narcotics more cautiously to their non-white patients. "Racial stereotyping is having a protective effect on non-white populations," according to Dr. Andrew Kolodny, the co-director of the Opioid Policy Research Collaborative at Brandeis.

The COVID-19 pandemic disproportionately affected African Americans, with more dying of the disease during its initial wave than other racial groups. In testifying before Congress, the leading epidemiologist on the U.S. Coronavirus task force, Dr. Anthony Fauci, testified that a combination of factors affect the disproportionate numbers of minorities infected. In responding as to whether institutional racism has played a part in the data gleaned by the CDC, he pointed out the risk of infection along with underlying conditions in certain demographics was a factor, but affirmed his opinion that this was the case. A Queen's University Belfast study found that there is insufficient evidence to attribute the greater susceptibility of black, Middle-Eastern and Asian individuals to the virus.

Black women are two and one-half times more likely to die from maternal causes than are white women. The infant-mortality rate for African Americans is 11 per 1,000 births, which is higher than the 2018 U.S. average of 5.7. There exists a persistent racial gap between black and white Americans in life expectancy; on average this life-expectancy gap is around 4 years. However, this greatly varies depending on both the state and city level. For example, in Wisconsin, the black-white life expectancy gap is about 6 years for females and 7 years for males, and in Washington D.C this gap is about 12 years for females and greater than 17 years among males.

In criminal conviction 

Although approximately one third of crack cocaine users are white or Hispanic people (reported past-year use in 2013 of 0.8%, 0.3% and 0.1% for blacks, whites and Hispanics, respectively), a large percentage of people convicted of possession of crack cocaine in federal courts in 1994 were black people. In 1994, 86.3% of the defendants convicted of crack cocaine possession were black people, while 10.3% were whites and 5.2% were Hispanics. Possession of powder cocaine was more racially mixed, with 52% of the offenders being whites, 29.7% blacks, and 17% Hispanics. Within the federal judicial system, a person convicted of possession with intent to distribute powder cocaine carries a five-year sentence for quantities of 500 grams or more, while a person convicted of possession with intent to distribute crack cocaine faces a five-year sentence for quantities of 5 grams or more. With the combination of severe and unbalanced drug-possession laws, along with the rates of conviction in terms of race, the judicial system has created a racial disparity. In 2015, sitting President Barack Obama visited a federal prison (a presidential first) to discuss how disparate sentencing affected prisoners and highlight how, in the United States, excessive sentencing was a detrimental outcome of harsh sentencing laws, as well as to discuss the need to change the approach. In the Senate, top Republican and Democratic senators, in a rare bi-partisan effort, negotiated for months to produce concrete fixes to these laws. The law was changed in 2010 to reduce disparity; it affected only new cases. The need, according to Senate, was for a retroactive fix to reduce the thousands serving long sentences after four decades of extreme sentencing policies. Studies have shown it is possible to reduce both prison populations and crime at the same time. The U.S. Sentencing commission announced a retroactive reduction in drug sentences following a year-long review, which will result in a mass release of 6,000 prisoners, all of whom have already served substantial time in prison. This action was done in an effort to reduce overcrowding and provide comfort to wrongfully accused drug offenders who were sent to jail over the past couple of decades. Some of those to be released will be deported, and all will be subject to further judicial review.

The issue of policies that target minority populations in large cities, also known as stop and frisk and arrest quotas, as practiced by the NYPD, have receded from media coverage due to lawsuits that have altered the practice. In Floyd vs City of New York, a ruling that created an independent Inspector General's office to oversee the NYPD, the federal judge called a whistle-blower's recordings of superiors' use of "quotas" the 'smoking gun evidence' that police were racially profiling and violating civilians' civil rights. The police officer at the center of the case settled with the city for $1.1 million and in a separate case won an additional settlement against the hospital where he was involuntarily confined after cops retaliated and unlawfully placed him in a psych ward for reporting fudged stats in his precinct. After taking office in 2014, New York City Mayor Bill de Blasio declined to continue litigating stop-and-frisk practices, and the number of minorities stopped under the practice dropped dramatically. The use of quotas to pad arrest figures also has fallen after lawsuits exposed the practice as carried on by drug enforcement officers.

A Stanford University study that analyzed 93 million traffic stops in the United States revealed that African Americans are twenty percent more likely to be stopped despite being less likely to be in possession of contraband compared to white people. In the state of California, 38% of people halted by police officers in Los Angeles were black people, despite accounting for only 9% of the population. In Washington, D.C., black people make up 46% of the population but composed 72% of the people stopped even though the difference in contraband hit rates between blacks and whites are not statistically significant. In Boston, blacks made up 64% of those stopped despite making up only 24% of the population; even after controlling for alleged gang involvement and prior arrest records, blacks were more likely to experience repeat police encounters and to be frisked or searched during an encounter. In Illinois, minority drivers are stopped 1.5 more times than white drivers, and Latino drivers are nearly 2 times more likely to be subjected to dog-sniff searches than are non-Hispanic whites but are found with contraband 1.6 times less often.

A Harvard University study found that in Massachusetts's criminal justice system minorities face greater risk to be represented across all parts of the criminal justice system in excess of their proportion of the population in that state. The likelihood that they will get arrested and convicted due to drug or weapons charges is eight times greater than for whites. Black people were found to receive average sentences that were 238 days longer, and Latino people 178 days longer, for the same offences. The study concluded that regarding 'stop and frisk' "The disparity in searches was more consistent with racial bias than with differences in criminal conduct,". The 24 percent of the city of Boston's population that was black made up 83 percent of those interrogated or frisked by police.

The Southern Poverty Law Center (SPLC) has found that, since 2008, after Barack Obama's election into office, racist hate groups have increased above 400%. The SPLC asserts that racism at the institutional level dies hard, and is still prevalent in many U.S. institutions, including law enforcement and the criminal justice system. Frequently these institutions use racial profiling along with greater police brutality. Another major disparity between race and capital punishment in the United States is that murder cases with white victims were more likely than those with black victims to result in a death sentence.

A recent report by former Homeland Security secretary Jeh Johnson found both overt and institutional racism to be a pervasive problem in the NYS court system. Citing a "Second class system of justice for people of color in NYS", Johnson's report set out recommendations to combat bias and systematic racism in interactions between the court system and people of color, particularly in New York City. Chief administrative Judge Lawrence K. Marks found the reports findings troubling and said the state would attempt to implement all the report's solutions. The report also highlighted intolerant racism among court officers. The team conducted interviews of over 300 court personnel, including lawyers whom reported instances of discrimination from court officers and Judges. Judges who were interviewed said that the lack of resources in the busiest courts had a disparate impact on minority clients making up the bulk of cases, and judicial diversity failed to mitigate the effect as few black candidates could pass muster in Upstate New York, where connections mattered in their appointment as judges. One judge said the reluctance to provide funding to New York city courts was "the very definition of institutional bias".

Anti-Drug Abuse Act of 1986

The disparity between the sentences given to black people and white offenders has been most highlighted by that of crack- and powdered-cocaine offenses, which received disparate sentencing pursuant to federal law. Between 1986 and 1997,
the number of federal drug prisoners quintupled, with 74% of those minorities
convicted of low-level drug offenses and sentenced under mandatory minimum laws
and later added conspiracy amendments to the law.

Members of Congress and state legislators believed these harsh, inflexible sentences would catch those at the top of the drug trade and deter others from entering it. Instead, this broad response to the drug problem brought in more low-level offenders, which resulted in overcapacity prison populations and increased burdens for taxpayers. Mandatory sentencing laws disproportionately affected minorities and, because of their severity, families were destroyed. As a result, many states are
experiencing efforts to roll back these laws and there are efforts in Congress
to end mandatory minimums. (See Mandatory sentencing.)

Juvenile court

A federal investigation initiated before the 2014 Michael Brown shooting in Ferguson, Missouri, found faults with the treatment given youths in the juvenile justice system in St. Louis County, Missouri. The Justice Department, following a 20-month investigation based on 33,000 cases over three years, reported that black youths were treated more harshly than were whites and that all low-income youths, regardless of race, were deprived of their basic constitutional rights. Youths who encountered law enforcement got little or no chance to challenge detention or get any help from lawyers. With only one public defender assigned to juveniles in a county of one million, and that Legal Aid handled 394 cases in 2014. The investigation was unrelated to the notorious case that roiled St. Louis, beginning before the police shooting of the unarmed black youth. The failure to grant access to counsel brought to light the practice of an informal process that could let offenders off with a warning or having them enter into diversion programs in lieu of being charged in court. But to be accepted into the informal process, offenders had to admit to guilt, which runs afoul of the right not to incriminate oneself in criminal proceedings. The investigation following Michael Brown's shooting found an enormous disparity in the way juvenile cases were handled, with black youths being 67% more likely than whites to be put through the formal criminal proceedings. It also found them more likely to be held in detention, and also subsequently sentenced to incarceration once the case was finished. They were also more likely to be detained for violating parole from a previous case.

The county did not cooperate fully with the Justice Department, and the St. Louis Family Court declined to comment, as did the state court system, of which it is a part. A Justice Department official faulted "the role of implicit bias when there are discretionary decisions to be made". They also reported that the court rarely considers the evidence for probable cause and juveniles are illegally denied the opportunity to challenge that evidence or a transfer of the case out of the juvenile justice system to adult court. In most state courts, the public defender's office decides who is poor enough to merit representation; in St. Louis Family Court the judge or court commissioner, sometimes based on different standards, decides who gets access to counsel. Most troubling to the justice official was the continuing use of court officials to recite complicated statutory language about the alleged crimes, then leading the defendants through "formulaic 'do you understand' and yes/no questions." Judges made no effort to find out if the pleas were coerced, whether the child had any criminal intent or especially, did they fully understand the consequences of pleading guilty to the charges. Their competency to take part in their own defense was never established and the legal aide in the cases examined never challenged a probable cause finding, hired an expert witness or challenged hearsay evidence or leading questions and most cases ended with the child pleading guilty. The Civil Rights Division (of the Justice Department) began four investigations beginning in 2013 delving into juvenile justice systems in Mississippi, Tennessee, Texas, and Missouri, and, while settlements were reached, it has had to file suit to overcome the disparities in criminal convictions.

Coupled with zero-tolerance discipline in schools, a "one-size-fits-all solution" decried by the American Bar Association, black and Latino youths are more likely to encounter negative contact with law enforcement and accrue violations, which leads to fines and failure to pay, which in turn leads to warrants and/or probation violations. This cycle has been shown to put children, particularly low-income minorities, in the school-to-prison pipeline.

Judicial misconduct

In 2010, two Washington state supreme court justices, Richard B. Sanders and James M. Johnson, were baffled at a court meeting to determine the fate of $25,000 in funding for various boards and commissions. They stated that there was too much African-American representation in the prison population because African Americans are known to commit a number of crimes and not because of their race. A black lawyer said that she was shocked to hear these two justices refer to a former Legal Aid lawyer's assertions in a report using the phrase poverty pimp. Shirley Bondon, a state Administrative Office of the Courts (AOC) manager who oversaw court programs critical of the legal system, told the justices that she believed that there was racial "bias in the criminal-justice system, from the bottom up." The response from Justice Saunders was critical of black people, stating that he did not believe that the barriers existed, except for poverty because it might restrict the ability to afford an attorney. James M. Johnson, who was noted as the most conservative judge on the court, agreed, noting that African Americans commit crimes against their own communities, to which Bondon objected, requesting a closed-door meeting with the court. Within, Justice Debra Stephens said that she heard Sanders and Johnson make the comments, including Johnson using the words "you all" or "you people" when he stated that African Americans commit crimes in their own communities. Others who attended the meeting stated that they were offended by the justices' remarks, saying that the comments showed a lack of knowledge and sensitivity. A Kitsap County District Court judge, James Riehl, concurred, as he was "acutely aware" of barriers to equal treatment in the legal system. In 2010, African Americans represented 4 percent of Washington State's population but 20 percent of the prison population. Nationwide, similar disparities have been attributed by researchers to sentencing practices, inadequate legal representation, drug-enforcement policies and criminal-enforcement procedures that unfairly affect African Americans.

In 2020, an investigation revealed that Oklahoma Judges who violated their judicial oaths and failed to comply with laws faced no sanctions as none had been imposed since 2004. Across the United States, thousands more were privately sanctioned in chambers by Supreme Court Justices and had their cases closed without the public ever being notified of what they were charged with. Some of the cases alleged racist statements, failure to notify defendants in jail of their right to a lawyer and lying to state officials investigating misconduct. The report identified 3,600 cases from 2008 to 2018 where judges were disciplined but had their identities hidden, along with the nature of the offences- from public scrutiny. Many of the justices whom resigned under threat of penalty did not face any sanctions and kept practicing law, as they did not admit to wrongdoing and confidential justice was doled out by other judges. The report found that 9 out of 10 judges sanctioned for misconduct were allowed to return to their duties, revealing a lax oversight and lenient disciplinary system in place for significant transgressions.

Bisbee Deportation

In 1918, the U.S. Department of Justice pursued charges against 21 officers and executives of the Phelps Dodge Mining Company for the kidnapping of 1,200 workers across state lines from Bisbee, Arizona. The men were subsequently released based on a pre-trial motion from the defense, claiming that the federal government had no basis for charging them, as no federal law was broken. Arizona officials never initiated criminal proceedings in state court against those responsible for the deportation of workers and their lost wages and other losses. The Justice Department appealed, but in United States v. Wheeler, 254 U.S. 281 (1920), Chief Justice Edward Douglass White wrote for an 8-to-1 majority that the U.S. Constitution did not empower the federal government to enforce the rights of the deportees. Rather it "necessarily assumed the continued possession by the states of the reserved power to deal with free residence, ingress, and egress." Only in a case of "state discriminatory action" would the federal government have a role to play. By this calculated reasoning, the officials situated at the Supreme Court erred in not taking the side that in today's legal lexicon had every right to seek justice and redress, not only for the stolen wages, union busting, false imprisonment and other crimes, but for the inherent right not to be forcibly removed from your home by men with guns and shipped in cattle cars across state lines as many homeowners were. That 8 of the 9 Supreme Court justices concurred and, based on anti-radical speech sentiment at the time (post WWI anti-union and IWW), leads to the conclusion that the government gave the company cover to remove the workers, many of whom were Mexicans advocating for better pay and working condition, to a place in the next state closer to the border with the admonition never to return. That few deportees returned and those that contested the deportations lost their cases to have their homes returned to necessity, and that in 1966 Finally, in United States v. Guest, 383 U.S. 745 (1966), the Supreme Court overruled Chief Justice White's conclusion that the federal government could protect the right to travel only against state infringement.

At the end of the conflict, Attorney General A. Mitchell Palmer and others advocated for a peacetime equivalent of the Sedition Act, using the Bisbee events as a justification. They stated that the only reason the company representatives and local law enforcement had taken the law into their own hands was that the government lacked the power to suppress radical sentiment directly. If the government was armed with appropriate legislation and the threat of long prison terms, private citizens would not feel the need to act. Writing in 1920, Harvard Professor Zechariah Chafee mocked that view: "Doubtless some governmental action was required to protect pacifists and extreme radicals from mob violence, but incarceration for a period of twenty years seems a very queer kind of protection." That this was considered vigilante actions by private citizens duly deputized by the local sheriff gives no weight to the racist component directed towards those of Mexican descent in Arizona, New Mexico, and Texas, who were being systematically forced from their homes in the United States beginning in 1910.

Lynching of people of Mexican descent

Vigilante actions and other acts of violence against Mexicans in the Southwest were documented from the 1850s to the 1930s. At least hundreds perhaps thousands of Mexicans were killed by white Anglo Americans and government forces, many of the victims were American citizens. Some of them were killed by people who wanted to drive them off their land and others were killed because they were suspected of being bandits or rebels. Many of them were lynched, including some who were taken from jail cells and killed in front of hundreds of people. 571 Mexicans were lynched between 1848 and 1928. Some Mexicans were killed in response to bandit raids, others were killed after they were accused of committing murders, others were killed after they were accused of stealing cattle, others were killed after they were accused of cheating at cards, and others were killed after they protested against injustice. For example, a month after the Brite Ranch raid in Texas, Rangers committed the Porvenir massacre near the Mexican border where 15 men and boys were executed and falsely accused of being involved in the raid. Efforts to increase awareness of the Porvenir massacre were initially stalled by the state commission on historic places, with the chairwoman of the local historical commission opposing the construction of a marker, claiming that it was being used by 'militant Hispanics' who wanted to receive reparations. She was later over-ruled by the head of the State Historical Commission, who brokered a deal by promising to erect a marker at the site of the Porvenir massacre in addition to promising to erect markers at Anglo ranches that were attacked by suspected Mexican Villistas.

Palmer Raids

According to the United States Department of Justice, Palmer violated his oath of office by misusing the Department of Justice to go illegally after those advocating for better wages. Strikers became targets of agent provocateurs who infiltrated meetings of "communist labor" and anti-war activists. After the Bisbee deportations became exposed in the press, Americans were divided about the treatment of illegal aliens, who were purported communists. Former President Theodore Roosevelt opined in the press that the Bisbee miners "had it coming, as they were hell-bent on havoc!" The Department of Justice went from advocating for persons deprived of rights and liberty by state actors to detaining them under dubious warrants and suspicion of radicalism. The Red Scare that fueled institutional racism in the 1920s against Russian Jews and other Eastern European immigrants was a backlash to the 1917 Bolshevik revolution in Russia and a bombing campaign early in 1919 by Italian anarchists advocating the overthrow of the government. The result was the infamous Palmer raids, ostensibly a deportation measure to remove dangerous aliens. In 1919 Attorney General A. Mitchell Palmer began a series of raids cooked up to remove radicals and anarchists from the United States. Warrants were requested from compliant officials in the Labor Department, and a number of foreign nationals caught up in the sweeping raids were eventually deported. As only the department of labor had the legal right to deport aliens, they did object to the methods; nevertheless, under color of law, the raids began on 7 November 1919. It was led by a 24-year-old J. Edgar Hoover heading a new division of the Justice Department's Bureau of Investigation, called the General Intelligence Division. Armed with responsibility for investigating the programs of radical groups and identifying their members, the raids began with agents of the Bureau of Investigation, together with local police, executing a series of well-publicized and violent raids against the Union of Russian Workers in 12 cities.

Newspaper accounts reported some were "badly beaten" during the arrests. Many later swore they were threatened and beaten during questioning. Government agents cast a wide net, bringing in some American citizens, passers-by who admitted being Russian, some not members of the Russian Workers. Others were teachers conducting night school classes in space shared with the targeted radical groups. Arrests far exceeded the number of warrants. Of 650 arrested in New York City, the government managed to deport just 43. Hoover organized the next raids. He successfully persuaded the Department of Labor to ease its insistence on promptly informing those arrested that they had the right to an attorney. Instead, Labor issued instructions that its representatives could wait until after the case against the defendant was established, "in order to protect government interests". Less openly, Hoover decided to interpret Labor's agreement to act against the Communist Party to include a different organization, the Communist Labor Party. Finally, despite the fact that Secretary of Labor William B. Wilson insisted that more than membership in an organization was required for a warrant, Hoover worked with more compliant Labor officials and overwhelmed Labor staff to get the warrants he wanted. Justice Department officials, including Palmer and Hoover, later claimed ignorance of such details.

The Justice Department launched a series of raids on 2 January 1920, with follow-up operations over the next few days. Smaller raids extended over the next six weeks. At least 3,000 were arrested, and many others were held for various lengths of time. The entire enterprise replicated the November action on a larger scale, including arrests and seizures without search warrants, as well as detention in overcrowded and unsanitary holding facilities. Hoover later admitted "clear cases of brutality". Some cases in Boston included torture, where detainees were placed in a 'hot box' above a furnace and given one glass of water and a slice of bread a day and kept there for 50 hours. The raids covered more than 30 cities and towns in 23 states, but those west of the Mississippi and south of Ohio were "publicity gestures" designed to make the effort appear nationwide in scope. Because the raids targeted entire organizations, agents arrested everyone found in organization meeting halls, not only arresting non-radical organization members but also visitors who did not belong to a target organization, and sometimes American citizens not eligible for arrest and deportation. In a few weeks, after changes in personnel at the Department of Labor, Palmer faced a new and very independent-minded Acting Secretary of Labor in Assistant Secretary of Labor Louis Freeland Post, who canceled more than 2,000 warrants as being illegal. Of the 10,000 arrested, 3,500 were held by authorities in detention; 556 resident aliens were eventually deported under the Immigration Act of 1918.

Other events
On 28 May 1920, the ACLU published its "Report Upon the Illegal Practices of the United States Department of Justice", which carefully documented the Justice Department's unlawful arrest of suspected radicals, illegal entrapment by agents provocateurs, and unlawful incommunicado detention. Such prominent lawyers and law professors as Felix Frankfurter, Roscoe Pound and Ernst Freund signed it. Harvard Professor Zechariah Chafee criticized the raids and attempts at deportations and the lack of legal process in his 1920 volume Freedom of speech. He wrote: "That a Quaker should employ prison and exile to counteract evil-thinking is one of the saddest ironies of our time." The Rules Committee gave Palmer a hearing in June, where he attacked Post and other critics whose "tender solicitude for social revolution and perverted sympathy for the criminal anarchists...set at large among the people the very public enemies whom it was the desire and intention of the Congress to be rid of." The press saw the dispute as evidence of the Wilson administration's ineffectiveness and division as it approached its final months.

In June 1920, a decision by Massachusetts District Court Judge George W. Anderson ordered the discharge of 17 arrested aliens and denounced the Department of Justice's actions. He wrote that "a mob is a mob, whether made up of Government officials acting under instructions from the Department of Justice or of criminals and loafers and the vicious classes." His decision effectively prevented any renewal of the raids.

In Montana, copper miners were dissatisfied with the Western Federation of Miners and thus clashes between the miners were formed leading to the detainment of many workers in the field. The U.S. District Court Judge George M. Bourquin, wrote in a decision granting a writ releasing them on 12 February 1920, "The Declaration of Independence, the writings of the Fathers of our Country, the Revolution, the Constitution and the Union, all were inspired to overthrow the like governmental tyranny. They are yet living, vital, potential forces to safeguard all domiciled in the country, aliens as well as citizens. If evidence of the alien's evil advocacy and teaching is so wanting that it exists in only that herein, and as secured herein, he is a far less danger to this country that are the parties who in violation of law and order, of humanity and justice, have brought him to deportation. They are the spirit of intolerance incarnate, and the most alarming manifestation in America today." In so saying, he placed the blame for the actions taken squarely on those creating a hysteria against a primarily Russian ethnic minority, and who managed to sidestep all blame by continuing to call such actions lawful. Hoover went on to head the FBI, which over its history also came to be known for the institutional racism of the COINTELPRO, Martin Luther King Jr. and Malcolm X operations and Palmer lost all support for his bid seeking the Democratic presidential nomination to replace Wilson. The judge summed it up neatly; 
"Thoughtful men who love this country and its institutions see more danger in them and in their practices and the government by hysteria they stimulate, than in the miserable, hated "Reds" that are the ostensible occasion of them all. Those people may confidently assume that even as the "Reds", they too in due time will pass, and the nation still lives. It is for the courts to deal with both, to hold both in check when brought within the jurisdiction."
Zechariah Chafee went on to write many significant works about civil liberties. His first book, Freedom of Speech, established modern First Amendment theory.

In immigration 
Many other minority groups were also victims of institutional racism. For example, immigration bans were imposed on Chinese people. On the West Coast during the 1870s, the intensifying competition for jobs between Chinese workers and whites motivated some whites to launch an anti-Chinese movement. The first Chinese Exclusion Act of 1882 was passed to prohibit Chinese from immigrating to the United States, as a result, only ten Chinese immigrants entered the United States in 1887. The 1917 Asiatic Barred Zone Act, sought to block immigration from Turkey to Indonesia and China, eliminating virtually all new arrivals from the South Asian subcontinent and Southeast Asia. There were other anti-immigration policies throughout U.S. history against France and Ireland in the late 1700s, and Southern Europeans, Eastern Europeans, Jews, Africans, Arabs, East Asians and Indians with the Immigration Act of 1924. Anti-immigration sentiment can also affect minorities who have been U.S. citizens for many generations, such as the internment of Japanese Americans during the World War 2 and Mexican Repatriation of the 1930s. The 1965 Immigration Act reversed the national-origins quota system that had been in place since the 1920s, which had discriminated against certain ethnic minorities, particularly those originating in the Eastern Hemisphere.

Between 1929 and 1939, during the Great Depression, 355,000 to one million Mexicans and Mexican Americans were repatriated or deported to Mexico, 40 to 60% of whom were U.S. citizens, overwhelmingly children. Voluntary repatriation was more common than formal deportation. The government formally deported at least 82,000 people to Mexico between 1929 and 1935. According to the INS, around 400,000 to 1 million Mexicans and Mexican-Americans moved to Mexico during the 1930s. Few were formally deported, with most going to Mexico from their own towns where officials using threats of deportation coerced them; or were repatriated through voluntary – though often coercive – repatriation programs directed by state and local governments, and charitable aid agencies.

The repatriation campaign was a response to migration west by the Oakies and housing and wage labor shortages in the United States during the Great Depression. Until the Great Depression, many American citizens had seen the value of the Mexicans as cheap labor. With increased poverty and fewer jobs, many Americans and officials scapegoated Mexicans. The Secretary of Labor in the Hoover administration, William N. Doak (Hoovervilles) scapegoated "illegal immigrants" (migrant workers) as taking jobs from Americans. While not specifying Mexicans, repatriation campaigns overwhelmingly targeted Mexicans. In 1931, the National Commission on Law Observance and Enforcement, the Wickersham Commission found the methods employed by Doak's subordinates to be unconstitutional. The policy continued into the administration of Franklin D. Roosevelt.

According to Abraham Hoffman, "from 1931 on, cities and counties across the country intensified and embarked upon repatriation programs, conducted under the auspices of either local welfare bureaus or private charitable agencies". The Los Angeles chairman of the board of supervisors' charities and public welfare committee (and later Los Angeles mayor), Frank L. Shaw had researched the legality of deportation but was advised by that only the federal government was legally allowed to deport people. As a result, the L.A. County supervisors called their campaign "repatriation", which Balderrama asserts was a euphemism for deportation.

C.P. Visel, the spokesman for Los Angeles Citizens Committee for Coordination of Unemployment Relief began his "unemployment relief measure" that would create a "psychological gesture" intended to "scarehead" Mexicans out of Los Angeles, through a series of "publicity releases announcing the deportation campaign, a few arrests would be made 'with all publicity possible and pictures', and both police and deputy sheriffs would assist". The Bureau of Immigration was responsible for many mass raids and deportations, and the local government was responsible for the media attention given to these raids to "scarehead" immigrants, specifically Mexicans, provoking many complaints and criticisms from the Mexican Consulate and the Spanish-language magazine La Opinión.

Numerous books have been written about the repatriations including 'Decade of Betrayal', by social history professor Raymond Rodriguez and Francisco Balderrama.
 In 1995, they wrote a book, which sparked legislative hearings and formal apologies from the state of California and Los Angeles County officials. In 2006, the House of Representatives congresspersons Hilda Solis and Luis Gutierrez called for an apology from the U.S. Government for the Repatriation. The Mexican repatriation campaign is not widely discussed in U.S. textbooks. In a 2006 survey of the nine most commonly used American history textbooks in the United States, four did not mention the topic, and only one devoted more than half a page to the topic. In total, they devoted four pages to the repatriation.

The Mexican labor that supplied U.S. agribusiness has cycled between needing workers and calls to repatriate them. Some calls were by Mexican farmers, because from time to time there were acute labor shortages in Mexico. With the growing diplomatic and security issues surrounding illegal border crossings, the INS increased its raids and apprehensions beginning in the early 1950s leading up to Operation Wetback in 1954 in cooperation with the Mexican government. While the Bracero program was in force, the INS deported one million Mexicans starting in 1954. Those apprehended were often deported without recovering property or contacting family and were often stranded without food or employment when they entered Mexico. Deported Mexicans often faced extreme conditions, and some were left in the desert; 88 deported workers died in 112-degree heat in July 1955. Most deported were sent by ship to Veracruz or transported by land to southern Mexican cities. During the Operation, recruitment of illegal workers by American growers continued due to the inexpensiveness of illegal labor and desire to avoid the bureaucratic obstacles of the Bracero program.

In the civil service 

Merit-based hiring to civil service titles are race-blind in terms of hiring preferences; in practice, however, there are titles that have resisted integration to the present day. Institutions that resist even past the civil right fights of the 1950s and 1960s resulted in court interventions in the 1970s and even up to the last decade. Many of the Consent Decrees that resulted from court intervention came about as a result of the federal government intervening due to EEOC complaints in hiring or attempts to litigate discrimination that was overt. Until 2007, when the Vulcan Society of the FDNY prevailed in court using the legal theory of disparate impact, many lawsuits resulted in racial quotas being imposed in hiring. Police and Fire Departments across the country have been slow to change the insular culture that kept them lacking in diversity and open to challenges.

Civil Service, as an institution, was traditionally used to prevent nepotism and the influence of politics in appointments to the position. Authorized at the federal level in 1871, it came about due to reforms of the spoils system in place since the 1830s, and abuses of the post-Civil War era, when Congress authorized the president to appoint a Civil Service Commission and prescribe regulations for admission to public service. A dissatisfied office-seeker assassinated President Garfield in 1881, and Congress was motivated to pass the Pendleton Civil Service Reform Act in 1883, which firmly established the Civil Service. During Reconstruction, this enabled the federal government to provide jobs for newly freed black people in the South (primarily the Postal Service) where no other employment opportunities existed for them. Since the inception of the merit system in 1881, the numbers of black people in federal Civil Service positions rose from 0.057 to 5.6% by 1910. Since 1883, the majority of federal employees are placed in positions that are classified by Civil Service designations. (see Also: U.S. Civil Service Reform)

In 1913, with segregation the law of the land, Southern Democrats in Congress under the administration of President Woodrow Wilson had attempted to remove as many minorities as possible from their established position in the federal Civil Service, especially at the Postal Service. This was accomplished by requiring the race of each applicant to a position be shown by a photograph.

This enabled the administration to demote and eliminate black civil servants from positions held in Civil Service and further prevented any new appointments, thus purposefully exacerbating black exclusion from the federal Civil Service. Wilson had campaigned promising to elevate blacks in his administration by matching the patronage offered them by past Republican administrations. Many black newspapers, based on his inaugural speech, supported him, but those Southern Democrats in Congress opposed to integration actively rendered him moot, and patronage appointments fell even lower. Claiming 'friction' among blacks and whites at the post office, they proposed segregating them. This was taken up by the Postmaster General and the Secretary of the Treasury, and when the cabinet and the president did not oppose the measure, Jim Crow practices in some departments was taken up with a vengeance. By 1921, those black postal workers not demoted or fired were behind a wall at the 'Dead Letter Office' in Washington, D.C., or placed behind screens where the other workers did not have to see them. Without any basis in fact or accumulation of complaints to justify segregation, it became unofficial policy. Signs appeared restricting toilets and lunchrooms, whole offices were segregated by room and workers were paired off by race. A virtual flood of proposed discriminatory laws were proposed in Congress ranging from 'Jim Crow' streetcars to excluding blacks from military commissions to officer in the Army or Navy and anti-miscegenation bills. There were also bills to restrict black immigration. This spread to the states where more bills passed restricting black people. Federal Civil Service did not fare well under Wilson, as he held that "it was to their advantage" and "likely to remove many of the difficulties which have surrounded the appointment and advancement of colored men and women", espousing the segregation taking place under his administration.

The next chapter was the Hatch Act of 1939, which prevented state and local civil servants from taking part in political activities or running for office. It was a response to conservative forces in Congress who wanted to prevent administration appointments to certain agencies aligned with the WPA and FDR presidential confidante Harry Hopkins, whom they felt were giving jobs to the 'wrong people'. Until the Brown vs. Board of Education Supreme Court decision and the related cases that ushered in the Civil Rights era, institutional segregation was upheld at the federal level by the Plessy v. Ferguson U.S. Supreme Court case decision, which the court overturned in 1954. Following this, cities consulted with their attorneys and as a result, integration began. This was replaced in turn by institutional racism, the practice of upholding the letter of the law, but not the spirit, in an effort to prevent minority hires from gaining ground in titles where they were disproportionately underrepresented, such as police and fire departments, and in management positions.

Post-integration period

Around the country in the 1950s, black people found common cause in challenging employment discrimination, and the colored newspapers took up the cause. Economically, jobs were becoming scarce for minorities during the post-war years as returning servicemen reclaimed the manufacturing and factory base. Civil Service looked to be a reasonable alternative to black people returning from World War II service overseas and black officers leaving the newly desegregated armed services. In Los Angeles in the 1950s, the NAACP fueled an integration campaign in the California Eagle and petitioned the fire commission to provide more jobs in the LAFD. When the Fire Chief Engineer John Alderson attempted to integrate the department, the resistance to integration created so-called 'Hate Houses' and resulted in the formation of The Stentorians as a protective force of guardians to protect minority firefighters. New York had previously experienced its own revelations when the Vulcan Society appeared before the city council and demanded the elimination of 'the black bed' in firehouses for black firemen. At that hearing in 1944, the NYC council chambers filled with FDNY brass on one side and black firefighters protesting the lack of promotional opportunities and racial harassment on the other.

With that as the backdrop, integration began and segregation was replaced by institutional racism, which took the form much the same way it did when black people first got hired before and during World War II. Black people once appointed to a Civil Service position were subjected to isolation, ostracism, outright hostility and separate quarters. After 1956, the first black hires to the LAFD after integration unfairly failed to finish academy training. The Vulcan Society in New York mentored many blacks, but progress was slow, with hiring not reflected in mirroring the population of the cities served until the passage of the Civil Rights Act of 1964, when the number of minority hirings increased. The U.S. Department of Labor in the 1970s began enforcing racial quotas during the Nixon administration that mandated black hiring, but it was the lawsuits of the 1970s that exploded the imposition of consent decrees across the country forcing the diversity of the hard to integrate titles. In 1971, the Vulcan Blazers of the Baltimore, Maryland fire department filed a groundbreaking lawsuit that resulted in the appointment of blacks to positions of officers up to assistant chief when the court ruled there had been discrimination in promotions. Other minority groups followed their lead and also took to the courts. In 2009, the City of Baltimore paid $4.6 million to settle a case filed by minority policemen alleging racial discrimination. As other recent lawsuits have proved, civil departments have held their heads responsible for cases of institutional racism, an example of which is the case in 2007 of the LAFD Chief, William Bamattre, who was retired by the mayor of Los Angeles after being perceived of kowtowing to racial pandering in responding to lawsuits affecting his department. Payouts to blacks and women had topped $7.5 million for cases alleging racism and harassment, and also the failure to diversify.

Affirmative action
Affirmative action, while originally meant to refer to a set of policies and practices preventing discrimination based on race, creed, color, and ethnicity, now often refers to policies positively supporting members of disadvantaged or underrepresented groups that have in the past suffered discrimination in areas such as education, employment, and housing. Historically and internationally, support for affirmative action has sought to achieve goals such as bridging inequalities in employment and pay, increasing access to education, promoting diversity, and redressing apparent past wrongs, harms, or hindrances.

In the 1990s President George H. W. Bush attempted to eliminate affirmative action during his term of office. Filing a brief against quotas in college admissions, he also stood against the use of quotas, preferences, and set-asides on the basis of race, sex, religion, or national origin, and abolished their use in hiring. Congress responded with the Civil Rights Act of 1991, which only covered the terms for settling cases where discrimination had previously been confirmed. It had been near impossible to prove a case of institutional discrimination in the courts, and many other cases were terminated upon imposition of a consent decree. While President George H. W. Bush's attempt failed, it did give rise to the 1997 California Proposition 209, a ballot initiative abolishing affirmative action in California universities. This closed down the avenues affirmative action initiatives had opened for minorities, as legislation no longer required California universities to actively facilitate the development of ethnically diverse campus populations. Consequently, employment discrimination lawsuits seeking compensation for discriminatory hiring declined, as arguments for redress on account of past wrongs under the 'catchup provisions' no longer worked in favor of claimants. Proposition 209 has withstood challenges such as the 2013 Amendment No. 5, which would have reversed 209 had it not been retracted by its main Senate sponsor prior to passage. In 2014 the UCLA Board of Regents publicly renounced 209 on account of the decline in minority admissions to California universities after 209 was implemented. The regents re-affirmed this in 2020.

Similar ballot initiatives to California 209 spread around the country, primarily in red states. In the 2003 case of Gratz v. Bollinger, the Supreme Court ruled that the University of Michigan's mis-implementation of affirmative action in its point-allocation-based admittance process had resulted in a homogenized statistical advantage for minority applicants and unconstitutionally rendered the university incapable of differentiating between the distinct diversity contributions of each individual. On the same day and concerning another University of Michigan (Law School) applicant, the supreme court ruled in the case of Grutter v. Bollinger that while failing to recognize the distinct contributions of minority groups was unconstitutional, the overall initiative of affirmative action – creating an inclusive, racially diverse demographic – was not.

Efforts to abolish affirmative action were not limited to California and Michigan. In 2008 American Civil Rights Institute chairman Ward Connerly successfully campaigned for the passage of legislation banning affirmative action in Nebraska. Three of the five states that ACRI pushed anti-affirmative action ballots in rejected them and it failed to make the ballot in another. Connerly stated, "I think that in some quarters, many parts of the country, a white male is really disadvantaged... Because we have developed this notion of women and minorities being so disadvantaged and we have to help them, that we have, in many cases, twisted the thing so that it's no longer a case of equal opportunity. It's a case of putting a fist on the scale."

Conservative objections to affirmative action include that although aimed at rectifying discriminatory practices, affirmative action is inherently discriminatory against the majority and the fulfillment of 'racial quotas' precludes employers from hiring the most qualified candidate available for a position. Supporters of affirmative action cite the extent to which past institutionalized racism adversely affected minorities. Their endorsement of measures to aid in the restitution of agency to marginalized and disenfranchised communities has resulted in push back in the form of claims of reverse racism.

In 2020, a study concluded that proposition 209 had caused harm to black and Hispanic students without any tangible gains for white or Asian students replacing them in the University of California system. With repeal of the controversial measure on the California ballot in 2020, the eleven other states that passed similar anti-affirmative action laws are also reviewing its effects on their minority admissions. Conservatives are still at the supreme court challenging race based admissions, with the DOJ under the Trump administration suing Yale university over alleged discrimination.

In education 
Standardized testing has also been considered a form of institutional racism, because it is believed to be biased in favor of people from particular socio-cultural backgrounds. Some minorities have consistently tested worse than whites on virtually all standardized tests, even after controlling for socioeconomic status, while others have tested consistently better. The cause of the achievement gaps between black, Hispanic, white and Asian students has yet to be fully elucidated.

Three cases before the SCOTUS have determined whether there is institutional racism in education. Bakke (1978) allowed minorities to gain an edge in university admissions and hiring. Justice Connors swing vote in Grutter (2003) was a rebuke of Proposition 209 and similar initiatives, giving a 25-year timeline where such interventions would no longer be necessary. Schuette (2013) banned the use of race in public university admissions. Through the use of discriminatory ballot initiatives (1997–2008) to bypass the law, gaining public acceptance of anti-affirmative action endeavors, the process of placing undue burdens on minorities seeking advancement has, in this century, become entrenched. In her dissent to Schutte, Associate Justice Sonia Sotomayor wrote that the voters of Michigan had "changed the basic rules of the political process in that State in a manner that uniquely disadvantaged racial minorities." Citing reverse-racism after the effects have been proven deleterious to minority admissions is repeating failed policy and furthers this bias. This offends portions of the Civil Rights Act of 1964, where discrimination on the basis of race, color, religion, sex or national origin was prohibited.

In higher education 
In the 1960s, students of color started attending colleges and universities in record numbers after the passage of the Civil Rights and Higher Education Acts. However, the obstacles of integration in predominantly white institutions of higher education led to unforeseen obstacles for faculty and students of color working and studying in such environments. According to a review of educational research, tension and violence followed, one reason being the lack of preparedness of many colleges and universities to teach a diversity of students. Initially, it was also difficult for many black students to attend college due to the poor quality of education in segregated schools.

The 1954 Brown vs. Board of Education decision was the beginning of the process of desegregation and the elimination of de jure discrimination. However, it was hard to determine the challenges that the process would present and the obstacles that would continue to exist. While the concept of "separate but equal" had been overturned by the U.S. Supreme Court, it was clear that the racial divide had not yet been resolved. As the years since Brown v. Board of Education passed, both verbal and physical abuse continued. After Brown v. Board of Education, the desegregated environment proved to be strenuous and was going to require some work. The increase of racial tension and racial incidents in institutes of higher education is said to be due to the "lack of knowledge, experience, and contact with diverse peers; peer-group influence; increased competition and stress; the influence of off-campus groups and the media; alcohol use; changing values; fear of diversity; and the perception of unfair treatment". Although Brown v. Board of Education was ruled in 1954, actual integration did not completely occur until many years later; the U.S. Supreme Court held multiple hearings on the desegregation of schools, continuously they maintained that Brown v. Board of Education must be followed by schools, colleges, and universities. The manner in which Brown v. Board of Education was drawn out years after the decision helped instill racism in education by illustrating the extraordinary lengths some educational institutions would go to avoid integration.

In 2008, the National Center for Education Statistics reported that while enrollment of minorities and students of color had risen, white enrollment still held the majority on average, accounting for 63 percent of undergraduate college and university students; however, 66 percent of the population was white in 2008. While this varies based on the region, state, and elite status, in general the majority of colleges and universities in the United States are predominantly white reflecting the white population percentage. According to the U.S. Department of Education, there had been a rise in hate crimes on college campuses, with 1250 hate crimes in 2016, up 25 percent from 2015; however, in 2019, all reported racial, ethnic, religious, sexual orientation, gender, gender identity, and disability hate crimes totaled 757, while racially motivated intimidation, destruction, damage, vandalism, and simple assault totaled 329.

Preparation for post-secondary education seems to be an issue. According to the U.S. Department of Education, being prepared for college is integral to whether or not a student is successful. While the government offers college preparation programs for minority and low-income students, programs such as GEAR UP and Federal TRIO Programs help prepare students for college to better ensure their success and retention, the access to these programs is relatively limited. While programs such as Federal TRIO Programs have grown since conception, there is still work that needs to be done if more minority students are expected to attend and succeed in a post-secondary institution. Due to availability of Federal TRIO Programs being subjective based on where geographically a student may be, the benefits are not completely being felt be the targeted communities. However, the positive effects of Federal TRIO Programs have been pretty bolstering – more minorities and low-income individuals are prepared when going to post-secondary institutions.

Despite efforts to improve the situation on college and university campuses, such as implementing affirmative action plans, anti-black racism and violence continue to occur. The effects of this violence extend beyond the incident itself. According to a U.S. study in Baltimore, racism has a correlation with health complications, such as high systolic blood pressure. Likewise, a study held from 1997 to 2003 found that racism led to higher rates of breast cancer. While this extends beyond education, it could illustrate why many minorities and students of color would feel uneasy putting themselves into an environment that could potentially garner more racism. While illustrations of institutional racism on college campuses can be found in newspapers and blogs, there are other places to learn more about these incidents. Aside from the media, one source that can be used to keep up to date on institutional racism in higher education is The Journal of Blacks in Higher Education (JBHE). This journal aims to provide as much information as possible about anti-black institutional racism. JBHE publishes resources, statistics, and current reports of race-related actions on college and university campuses. For example, JBHE reported on the 2015 University of Oklahoma Sigma Alpha Epsilon racism incident. Other media resources where reports on racial incidents on college campuses can be found is Inside Higher Ed and the Southern Poverty Law Center

In 2016, the U.S. Department of Education released a report on crime in schools. Of the racial hate crimes reported on college campuses in 2013, 41% were vandalisms, 37% were intimidations, and 38% were simple assaults. According to the U.S. Department of Education, there were 146 reported cases of racial harassment on college and university campuses in 2015. However, this number by no means is a true portrayal of the actual amount of racial harassment that occurs. Research conducted by the Higher Education Research Institute claims that only 13% of these incidents get reported. According to the Center for College Health and Safety, one reason that so few incidents get reported is that there is a lack of awareness about what consists of a hate crime, as well as where one must report such a crime. Although data is limited to what has been reported, the FBI allows public access to numerous tables and statistics about hate crimes reported in 2015. There were 4,029 hate crimes motivated by race/ethnicity/ancestry, 52.7% of which the FBI reports were motivated by anti-black bias. Out of 3,310 racial bias hate crimes, 7.9% occurred at schools/colleges. As of May 2017, the Anti-Defamation League has reported that 107 incidents of white-supremacist posters being posted on American campuses since the beginning of the 2016 school year have been verified. 65 of these reported incidents have occurred since January 2017.

Fakehatecrimes.org provides a database with links to news sources that report hate crimes that have been falsely reported. For example, a student at Capital University claimed to have found a race-related note on his door, and his story was shared on the university newspaper. Later, in another article, the newspaper shared how the student confessed after investigation that he made the story up. Complex, a news source, published an article naming the "most hate-filled colleges in America" based on data from College Stats.

Numerous news sources, including Inside Higher Ed and Southern Poverty Law Center, and the Brookings Institution, reported that there was a spike in racial hate crimes and harassment following the election of Donald Trump as President of the United States. Although each case has not been verified, the SPLC claimed to have counted 201 racial incidents in less than a week. The largest number of incidents are labeled as "anti-black" and account for over 50 of the occurrences, nearly 40 of which took place on college campuses. Kimberly Griffin, a professor at the University of Maryland who studies and has authored numerous publications on campus racial climate, states the following in an Inside Higher Ed article: Under Title VI, all higher education institutions that receive federal funding must take certain actions against incidents of racial discrimination that are deemed "sufficiently serious" or that negatively impact a student's education. These actions include investigating the incident, making efforts to stop the current and possible future occurrence, and fixing the issues that have come about due to the incident. Similar to Title VI, the Clery Act is another act that requires higher education institutions that receive federal funding to have certain obligations regarding campus crime. The main requirement is that these institutions must create an annual report that details the crime that has taken place in the past three years on campuses and the efforts made to stop it. These reports must be made available to all students and staff, which allows for greater transparency about the existing crime on campuses.

Students across the nation have worked to end racial discrimination on campuses by organizing and participating in protests. One of the most notable examples is that of the 2015–16 University of Missouri protests, which led to protests at 50 universities. Lists of demands made by students at 80 American universities detailing what should be done to combat racism on campuses have been collected by WeTheProtesters, an advocacy group.

Impact on faculty 
Structural inequality may be ignored under the assumption that racism will disappear within its own time. Racism may be manifest in a variety of ways, including but not limited to, undervaluation of research, unwritten rules and policies regarding the tenure process, and a lack of mentorship for faculty of color. Women of color faculty are often found doubly worse off as they face discrimination based on both race and gender. According to 2020 data, faculty members at institutions of higher education were predominantly white, with faculty of color constituting roughly 26% of total faculty, with 12% Asian, 7% black, 6% Latino, less than 1% American Indian, and 1% two or more races (see chart). Failure to fully implement affirmative action has been identified as another contributing factor to low numbers of representation.

Faculty members of color often engage in research regarding issues of diversity, which many whites deemed "risky". Widespread beliefs founded on the concept of meritocracy, where success is based solely on individual effort, put into question research revealing structural issues that contribute to success. Political undertones of research within the social sciences are used to put the validity and scientific nature of the findings into question, despite the fact that research in these fields is conducted in the same manner as research in less politically contentious areas of interest. Research methodologies long accepted in other disciplines are called into question depending on the implications of findings, particularly when these findings may reveal racial inequities in the general population and/or the institution itself. "Thus, research appearing to be neutral and scholarly, has important political manifestations, including the justification for racial inequalities that are replicated within the student and alumni bodies of institutions that formally state that they value diversity even as all of their internal mechanisms reproduce exclusionary dominance for some racial groups".

This concern is especially glaring in private institutions, where concerns regarding the reception of said research by alumni, corporate interests, and other potential donors play into acceptance of research by faculty. In one case study, race- and diversity-related research deemed valid by the highest level of national disciplinary associations was rejected by faculty and administrators, alluding to the existence and enforcement of unwritten rules regarding research acceptance. The rejection of research by faculty of color is a contributing factor to difficulty attaining tenure, with a higher performance bar set for those whose findings may contradict widely accepted beliefs regarding race relations.

Faculty members of color also face barriers as they work to include topics of diversity in their courses, as whites often resist the inclusion of multicultural perspectives. Challenges in the classroom appear to be connected to issues of gender and age as well as race. For example, African-American women faculty aged 35 and younger are challenged more by whites in their 20s, while those 40 and older face more challenges from students in nontraditional age groups.

Impact on students 

The racial demographics of institutions of higher education in the United States are quickly changing. Institutions of higher education were often traditionally known as "predominantly white institutions" (PWIs). These institutions are now challenged to improve their diversity efforts and create policies that address the root cause of negative racial climates on PWI campuses. It is estimated that by 2010, 40% of high school graduates would be non-white. While racial homogeneity in high schools increased, institutions of higher education were becoming more racially diverse. Due to racial homogeneity in high schools, some college students occasionally find themselves having their first interracial contact in college. Universities and colleges that have identified diversity as one of their priorities should plan how to strategically and in a sensitive manner create a campus climate in which all students, in particular students of color in a PWI, do not have to risk feeling unsafe, discriminated against, marginalized, or tokenized to obtain a post-secondary degree.

Data have shown that students of color and whites have different perceptions of campus racial climates. In a survey of 433 undergraduate students at one institution found that, in comparison to whites, students of color felt differently about campus policies. Whites were more often to describe their campus racial climate as positive, while students of African descent rated it as negative. Findings indicate that students of color experience harassment that is, "offensive, hostile, or intimidating" at higher rates than whites, which interferes with their learning. Further, "students of color perceived the climate as more racist and less accepting than did whites, even though whites recognized racial harassment at similar rates as students of color". In addition, many African-American students have a hard time to fit in at predominantly white colleges because of the fear of "becoming white."

Whites also felt more positive about their classroom experience and the way professors presented various viewpoints in the curriculum, about institutional policies as well as recruitment and retention of Student of Color. Students of African descent and other students of color felt the campus environment was not friendly and that they had been targets of racism. In another study of 5,000 first year students at 93 institutions, whites were more likely to agree with the statement that "racial discrimination is no longer a problem" than students of color. whites were also more likely to feel that the campus climate is improving in comparison to students of color. Whites felt the campus climate was non-racist, friendly, and respectful while students of color felt that it was racist, hostile, and disrespectful. Research has shown that racial diversification in colleges and universities, without intentional education about systemic racism and the history of race in the United States, can lead to creating a racial campus climate that is oppressive towards students of color. History textbooks in the United States generally gloss over the unpleasant portions of history, resulting in many students being unaware of the Trail of Tears, the workers struggles of the 20th century and the removal in the west of the indigenous. There needs to be, "intentional education interventions related to the changing racial composition of college students [which] would likely influence how the climate of an environment changes".
If institutional racism is to be addressed in institutes of higher education, different types of interventions need to be created, in particular, interventions created specifically for the academy. Rankin and Reason's research concluded that for intervention to be effective, faculty would need to be used as socializing agents on campus, in particular, because intellectual and behavioral norms on most campuses are set by faculty and, these norms have a heavy impact on campus climate. An example of students trying to change racial campus climate is the Being Black at the University of Michigan #BBUM moment. The Black Student Union is organizing and collaborating with organizations to bring attention to the racial climate at the University of Michigan and how it is affecting all students. To create interventions that lead to sustainable learning about race, institutions of higher education need to equally value the histories and experiences of students of color and whites. One example of this is required coursework through the departments of African/African-American Studies, Chicano studies, Asian-American studies, Arab-American studies, and Native American studies alongside the History department. Research has shown that curricular diversity is positively associated with intergroup attitudes, decreased racial prejudice and intergroup understanding, and attitudes toward campus diversity.

In politics

Reconstruction

After slavery was abolished, the government went through a series of changes that reflected the presence of new (black) citizens in the United States. Newly acquired freedom founded a growth in African-American participation in politics. This period of increased African-American participation, from 1867 to 1877, is known as Reconstruction. Despite the increase in African-American participation in politics, Reconstruction is not mentioned as an example of how black politics strive to be. There are very distinct viewpoints concerning this time period. Some believed that corruption had run rampant in the South with the introduction of newly freed slaves into legislatures, and a great deal of attention was given to the negativity that surrounded the introduction of black individuals into government. Reconstruction in South Carolina particularly was under scrutiny as the legislators were predominantly black. The happenings in the South Carolina legislature were described negatively and seen as pro-black and significantly focused on issues that only pertained to black people. Attention was solely focused on the misgivings occurring within the legislature, such as "unethical appropriation of state funds by members of the legislature" and other unethical or illegal acts committed by both black and white legislators in South Carolina. Another set of issues brought up was the multitude of expensive decorative items and embellishments that were purchased for the refurbishment of the State House. Whites were generally left out of the criticisms, despite their own contributions, and were referred to as victims of corruption due to the influence of black people.

Others believed that Reconstruction was not to blame for all corruption in legislation. This faction of people saw the constructive debates and conversations that flowed within the Southern legislatures. They were also more receptive to the positive aspects and characteristics of black legislators that were displayed during their time in office.

Despite the amount of eager participants, this period eventually led to a decline in black participation in politics. The backlash of those against increase of black participation in politics effectively began to cause the number of participants to stop and then decline. In the mid-20th century, despite past involvement, black participation in politics was low. Black participation was not a common occurrence in comparison to overall participation, and it was often celebrated when black candidates or politicians did particularly well in their political endeavors. This decline was attributed to a white counterattack of the Reconstruction movement. Many methods were used to dissuade black people from taking office. One of the most prominent was violence. An example of that would be the Ku Klux Klan, a secretive group whose members believed in white supremacy. The lynching, beatings, and intimidation of black people helped to hasten the decline of black participation in politics. Coercion was also another method used to dissuade black participation in politics, particularly voting. Threats of loss jobs and refusal of medical care are some of the coercion methods employed. Coercion did not play as big of a role as direct physical violence however it did serve to further hinder the growth of black participation in politics. These methods helped to forge a political system that has a scarce amount of minorities in office.

Representation 
Black representation in Congress had been scarce, with fewer than eight blacks in Congress per Congressional periods since the end of the Civil War up until the Nixon era, when there were 11 black members of Congress (ten in the House and one in the Senate). After the 91st Congress, black representation began to increase, particularly among black Democrats.

In technology 
Institutional racism's connections to technology have been an area that has not been sufficiently addressed. In her article "Race and Racism in Internet Studies", Jessie Daniels writes "the role of race in the development of Internet infrastructure and design has largely been obscured. As Sinclair observes, 'The history of race in America has been written as if technologies scarcely existed, and the history of technology as if it were utterly innocent of racial significance. Sociologist Ruha Benjamin writes further in her book Race After Technology: Abolitionist Tools for the New Jim Code that researchers "tend to concentrate on how the Internet perpetuates or mediates racial prejudice at the individual level rather than analyze how racism shapes infrastructure and design." Benjamin makes connections between institutional racism and racism in technology and notes the importance of future research on institutionalized racism in technology as well as the "technology of structural racism."

In the military
The U.S. Army in June 2020 instituted changes to its promotion policy to counteract institutional racism, as part of its efforts to counter unconscious bias that caused black officer candidates to be passed over more often than were similarly qualified whites. For instance, photographs of candidates will no longer be part of their promotional packages, which had been found to hinder advancement opportunities for black soldiers.

See also 

Critical race theory
Environmental racism
First world privilege
Institutional abuse
Institutionalized discrimination
Ketuanan Melayu
Legacy preferences
National Origins Formula
Race and crime
Structural violence
Teaching for social justice
Weaver v NATFHE
White privilege

References

Bibliographies 

 Stokes, DaShanne. (In Press) Legalized Segregation and the Denial of Religious Freedom

Further reading 

Institutional Racism and the Police Institutional Racism and the Police: Fact or Fiction?, Civitas thinktank pamphlet about the Macpherson Report
Paying the Price: The Human Cost of Racial Profiling On causes and effects of institutional racism in the Canadian criminal justice system

 
 

Canada Consolidation Indian Act R.S.C., 1985, c. I-5 Current to 9 June 2015. Last amended on 2 April 2015 and published by the Minister of Justice at the following address:  "Justice Laws Website" / "Site Web de la législation (Justice)", Government of Canada
John Komlos, “Covert Racism in Economics,” FinanzArchiv/Public Finance Analysis, 77 (2021) 1: 83-115.

Racism
Definition of racism controversy
Institutional abuse
Political science terminology
Sociological terminology
Articles containing video clips